= List of German painters =

This is a list of German painters.

== A ==
- Hans von Aachen (1552–1615)
- Aatifi (born 1965)
- Karl Abt (1899–1985)
- Tomma Abts (born 1967)
- Andreas Achenbach (1815–1910)
- Oswald Achenbach (1827–1905)
- Herbert Achternbusch (1938–2022)
- Franz Ackermann (born 1963)
- Johann Adam Ackermann (1780–1853)
- Max Ackermann (1887–1975)
- Otto Ackermann (1872–1953)
- Albrecht Adam (1786–1862)
- Benno Adam (1812–1892)
- Emil Adam (1843–1924)
- Eugen Adam (1817–1880)
- Franz Adam (1815–1886)
- Heinrich Adam (1787–1862)
- Luitpold Adam (1888–1950)
- Jankel Adler (1895–1949)
- Salomon Adler (1630–1709)
- Christoph Ludwig Agricola (1667–1719)
- Karl Agricola (1779–1852)
- August Ahlborn (1796–1857)
- Erwin Aichele (1887–1974)
- Wolfram Aichele (1924–2016)
- Max Ainmiller (1807–1870)
- Josef Albers (1888–1976)
- Heinrich Jacob Aldenrath (1775–1844)
- William Alexander (1915–1997)
- Christian Wilhelm Allers (1857–1915)
- Jakob Alt (1789–1872)
- Theodor Alt (1846–1937)
- Albrecht Altdorfer (c 1480–1538)
- Kai Althoff (born 1966)
- Karl Altmann (1802–1861)
- Hans am Ende (1864–1918)
- Christoph Amberger (1505–1562)
- Heinrich Amersdorffer (1905–1986)
- Tobias Andreae (1823–1873)
- Peter Angermann (born 1945)
- Hermann Anschütz (1802–1880)
- Horst Antes (born 1936)
- Karl von Appen (1900–1981)
- Joseph Ignaz Appiani (1706–1785)
- Clara Arnheim (1865–1942)
- Johann Samuel Arnhold (1766–1828)
- Ferdinand von Arnim (1814–1866)
- Heinrich Gotthold Arnold (1785–1854)
- Ulrike Arnold (born 1950)
- Carl Arp (1867–1913)
- Hans Arp (1886–1966)
- Otto Arpke (1886–1943)
- Isidor Ascheim (1891–1968)
- Hans Aschenborn (1888–1931)
- Fritz Ascher (1893–1970)
- Louis Asher (1804–1878)
- Frank Auerbach (1931–2024)

== B ==
- Johannes Theodor Baargeld (1892–1927)
- Johanna Juliana Friederike Bacciarelli (1733–1809 or later)
- Elvira Bach (born 1951)
- Johann Sebastian Bach (1748–1778)
- Karl Daniel Friedrich Bach (1756–1829)
- Carola Baer-von Mathes (1857–1940)
- Emanuel Bachrach-Barée (1863–1943)
- Johann Daniel Bager (1734–1815)
- Johann Karl Bähr (1801–1869)
- Theodor Baierl (1881–1932)
- Hans Baldung (c. 1484–1545)
- Jan Balet (1913–2009)
- Karl Ballenberger (1801–1860)
- Hans Baluschek (1870–1935)
- Fritz Bamberger (1814–1873)
- Ernst von Bandel (1800–1876)
- Caroline Bardua (1781–1864)
- Eduard Bargheer (1901–1979)
- Hans von Bartels (1856–1913)
- Emil Bartoschek (1899–1969)
- Georg Baselitz (1938–2026)
- Mathilde Battenberg (1878-1936)
- Emil Bauch (1823–c. 1874)
- Jeanna Bauck (1840–1926)
- Michael Bauer (born 1973)
- Rudolf Bauer (1889–1953)
- Gustav Bauernfeind (1848–1904)
- Caspar Baum (born 1963)
- Paul Baum (1859–1932)
- Willi Baumeister (1889–1955)
- Karin Baumeister-Rehm (born 1971)
- Tilo Baumgartel (born 1972)
- Armin Baumgarten (born 1967)
- Bodo Baumgarten (1940–2022)
- Johann Wilhelm Baur (1607–1640)
- August von Bayer (1803–1875)
- Thommie Bayer (born 1953)
- Alf Bayrle (1900–1982)
- Fritz Beblo (1872–1947)
- August Becker (1821–1887)
- Ferdinand Becker (1846–1877)
- Hermann Heinrich Becker (1817–1885)
- Jakob Becker (1810–1872)
- Ludwig Hugo Becker (1834–1868)
- Philipp Jakob Becker (1763–1829)
- Max Beckmann (1884–1950)
- Karl Becker (1820–1900)
- Benedikt Beckenkamp (1747–1828)
- René Beeh (1886−1922)
- Josef Konstantin Beer (1862–1933)
- Adalbert Begas (1836–1888)
- Carl Joseph Begas (1794–1854)
- Luise Begas-Parmentier (1843–1920)
- Oskar Begas (1828–1883)
- Akbar Behkalam (1944–2025)
- Franz Joachim Beich (1666–1748)
- Johannes Beilharz (born 1956)
- Gisela Beker (1932–2015)
- Hans Bellmer (1920–1975)
- Eduard Bendemann (1811–1889)
- Amalie Bensinger (1809–1889)
- William Berczy (1744–1813)
- Charlotte Berend-Corinth (1880–1967)
- Josefa Berens-Totenohl (1891–1969)
- Rudolf Bergander (1909–1970)
- Claus Bergen (1885–1964)
- Georg Bergmann (1821–1870)
- Johann Martin Bernatz (1802–1878)
- Meister Bertram (c. 1345–c. 1415)
- Anke Besser-Güth (1940-2019)
- Johann Wilhelm Beyer (1725–1796)
- Robert Beyschlag (1838–1903)
- Hanna Bieber-Böhm (1851–1910)
- Adolf Bierbrauer (1915–2012)
- Karl Eduard Biermann (1803–1892)
- Peter Binoit (c. 1590–1632)
- Norbert Bisky (born 1970)
- Carl Blechen (1798–1840)
- Georg Bleibtreu (1828–1892)
- Fritz Bleyl (1880–1966)
- Anna Katharina Block (1642–1719)
- Benjamin von Block (1631–1690)
- Josef Block (1863–1943)
- Hugo von Blomberg (1820–1871)
- Oscar Bluemner (1867–1938)
- Gregor von Bochmann (1850–1930)
- Arnold Bode (1900–1977)
- Leopold Bode (1831–1906)
- Gottlieb Bodmer (1804–1837)
- Arvid Boecker (born 1964)
- Pedro Boese (born 1972)
- Corbinian Böhm (born 1966)
- Hans Bohrdt (1857–1945)
- Christian Ludwig Bokelmann (1844–1894)
- Hanns Bolz (1885–1918)
- Friedrich von Bömches (1916–2010)
- Paula Bonte (1840–1902)
- Hinrik Bornemann (c. 1450–1499)
- Dieter Borst (born 1950)
- Friedrich Boser (1811–1881)
- Harald Julius von Bosse (1812–1894)
- Otto Richard Bossert (1874–1919)
- Eberhard Bosslet (born 1953)
- Friedrich August Bouterwek (1806–1867)
- Erwin Bowien (1899-1972)
- Anton Braith (1836–1905)
- August von Brandis (1859–1947)
- Martin Brandenburg (1870–1919)
- Heinrich Brandes (1803–1868)
- Marianne Brandt (1893–1983)
- Louis Braun (1836–1916)
- VG Braun-Dusemond (1919–1998)
- Rudolf Bredow (1909–1973)
- Ferdinand Max Bredt (1860–1921)
- K.P. Brehmer (1938–1997)
- Carl Breitbach (1833–1904)
- Heinrich Breling (1849–1914)
- Albert Heinrich Brendel (1827–1895)
- Louise Catherine Breslau (1856–1927)
- Johann Michael Bretschneider (1680–1729)
- Philipp Hieronymus Brinckmann (1709–1760)
- Gottfried Brockmann (1903–1983)
- Heinrich Brocksieper (1898–1968)
- Christian Brod (1917–2012)
- August Bromeis (1813–1881)
- Franz Bronstert (1895–1967)
- Wilhelm Brücke (1800–1874)
- Alexander Bruckmann (1806–1852)
- Ferdinand Brütt (1849–1936)
- Christoph Brüx (born 1965)
- Lothar-Günther Buchheim (1918–2007)
- Carl Buchheister (1890–1964)
- Erich Buchholz (1891–1972)
- Ludwig Buchhorn (1770–1856)
- Elisabeth Büchsel (1867–1957)
- Heinz Budweg (born 1940)
- Karl Albert Buehr (1866–1952)
- Franz Bunke (1857–1939)
- Anton Burger (1824–1905)
- Ludwig Burger (1825–1884)
- Jonas Burgert (born 1969)
- Heinrich Bürkel (1802–1869)
- Peter Burnitz (1824–1886)
- Friedrich Bury (1763–1823)
- Wilhelm Busch (1832–1908)
- Georg Heinrich Busse (1810–1868)
- Michael Buthe (1944–1994)
- Bernhard Buttersack (1858–1925)
- Erich Büttner (1889–1936)
- André Butzer (born 1973)

== C ==
- Daniel Caffé (1750–1815)
- Heinrich Campendonk (1889–1957)
- Wilhelm Camphausen (1818–1885)
- Peter Candid (c. 1548–1628)
- Johann Hermann Carmiencke (1810–1867)
- Carl Gustav Carus (1789–1869)
- Peter Caulitz (c.1650–1719)
- Ludwig Choris (1795–1828)
- Philipp Christfeld (1796/97–1874)
- Kiddy Citny (born 1957)
- Lorenz Clasen (1812–1899)
- Gustav Adolf Closs (1864–1938)
- Ferdinand Collmann (1762–1837)
- Edward Harrison Compton (1881–1960)
- Edward Theodore Compton (1849–1921)
- Carl Conjola (1773–1831)
- Carl Emanuel Conrad (1810–1873)
- Johann Wilhelm Cordes (1824–1869)
- Lovis Corinth (1858–1925)
- Peter von Cornelius (1783–1867)
- Erich Correns (1821–1877)
- Helene Cramer (1844–1916)
- Molly Cramer (1852–1936)
- Augustin Cranach (1554–1595)
- Lucas Cranach the Elder (c. 1472–1553)
- Lucas Cranach the Younger (1515–1586)
- Georg Heinrich Crola (1804–1879)

== D ==
- Eduard Daege (1805–1883)
- Heinrich Anton Dähling (1773–1850)
- Maximilian Dasio (1865–1954)
- Gabriela Dauerer (1958–2023)
- Heinrich Maria Davringhausen (1894–1970)
- John Decker (1895–1947)
- Wilm Dedeke (c. 1460–c. 1528)
- Ernst Deger (1809–1885)
- Balthasar Denner (1685–1749)
- Adolf Des Coudres (1862–1924)
- Ludwig Des Coudres (1820–1878)
- Ludwig Dettmann (1865–1944)
- Christa Dichgans (1940–2018)
- Christophe Didillon (born 1971)
- Karl Diebitsch (1899–1985)
- Karl Wilhelm Diefenbach (1851–1913)
- Jakob Fürchtegott Dielmann (1809–1885)
- Albert Christoph Dies (1755–1822)
- Anton Dietrich (1833–1904)
- Christian Wilhelm Ernst Dietrich (1712–1774)
- Wendel Dietterlin (c. 1550–1599)
- Feodor Dietz (1813–1870)
- Wilhelm von Diez (1839–1907)
- Ludwig Dill (1848–1940)
- Johann Georg von Dillis (1759–1841)
- Georg Friedrich Dinglinger (1666–1720)
- Otto Dix (1891–1969)
- Carl Emil Doepler (1824–1905)
- Emil Doepler (1855–1922)
- Max Doerner (1870–1939)
- Franz Domscheit (1880–1965)
- Franz Burchard Dörbeck (1799–1835)
- Johann Jakob Dorner the Elder (1741–1813)
- Anton Josef Dräger (1794–1833)
- Heinrich Dreber (1822–1875)
- Johann Friedrich Dryander (1756–1812)
- Eugen Dücker (1756–1812)
- Balthasar Anton Dunker (1746–1807)
- Albrecht Dürer (1471–1528)
- Hermann Dyck (1812–1874)
- Udo Dziersk (born 1961)

== E ==
- Konrad Eberhard (1768–1859)
- Adam Eberle (1804–1832)
- Robert Eberle (1815–1862)
- Johann Christian Eberlein (1770–1815)
- Albert Ebert (1906–1976)
- John Giles Eccardt (1720–1799)
- Michael Echter (1812–1879)
- Friedrich Eckenfelder (1861–1938)
- Heinrich Ambros Eckert (1807–1840)
- Otto Eckmann (1865–1902)
- John Eckstein (1735–1817)
- Martin Eder (born 1968)
- Carl Eggers (1787–1863)
- Franz Xaver Eggert (1802–1876)
- Julie von Egloffstein (1792–1869)
- Julius von Ehren (1864–1944)
- Paul Ehrenberg (1876–1949)
- Alexander Eibner (1862–1935)
- Friedrich Eibner (1826–1877)
- Franz Eichhorst (1885–1948)
- Elisabeth von Eicken (1862–1940)
- Andreas Eigner (1801–1870)
- Fritz Eisel (1929–2010)
- Felix Eisengräber (1874–1940)
- Marie Ellenrieder (1791–1863)
- Friedrich August Elsasser (1810–1845)
- Adam Elsheimer (1578–1610)
- Ludwig Elsholtz (1805–1850)
- Wilhelm Emelé (1830–1905)
- Edgar Ende (1901–1965)
- Sylvester Engbrox (born 1964)
- Johann Friedrich Engel (1844–1921)
- Carl Engel von der Rabenau (1817–1870)
- Horus Engels (1914–1991)
- Karl von Enhuber (1811–1867)
- Josef Otto Entres (1804–1870)
- Ulrich Erben (born 1940)
- Otto Erdmann (1834–1905)
- Fritz Erler (1868–1940)
- Johann Franz Ermels (1641–1693)
- Max Ernst (1891–1976)
- Hermann Eschke (1823–1900)
- Franz Joseph Esser (1891–1964)
- Stefan Ettlinger (born 1958)
- Ernst Ewald (1836–1904)
- Julius Exter (1863–1939)
- Carl Gottfried Eybe (1813–1893)
- Adolf Eybel (1802–1882)

== F ==
- Christian Wilhelm von Faber du Faur (1780–1857)
- Johann Joachim Faber (1778–1846)
- Carl Ferdinand Fabritius (1637–1673)
- Wilhelm Facklam (1893–1972)
- Ludwig Fahrenkrog (1867–1952)
- Joachim Martin Falbe (1709–1782)
- Joseph Fassbender (1903–1974)
- Berthold Faust (born 1935)
- Joseph Fay (1813–1875)
- Christian Gottlob Fechhelm (1732–1816)
- Eduard Clemens Fechner (1799–1861)
- Hans Feibusch (1898–1998)
- Manfred Feiler (1925–2020)
- Paul Feiler (1918–2013)
- Max Feldbauer (1869–1948)
- Conrad Felixmüller (1897–1977)
- Ferdinand Fellner (1799–1859)
- Melchior Feselen (c. 1495–1538)
- Rainer Fetting (born 1949)
- Johann Michael Feuchtmayer (1709–1772)
- Anselm Feuerbach (1829–1880)
- Martin von Feuerstein (1856–1941)
- Willy Fick (1893–1967)
- Friedrich Kurt Fiedler (1894–1950)
- Johann Dominicus Fiorillo (1748–1821)
- Klaus Fisch (1893–1975)
- John Fischer (1786–1875)
- Joseph Anton Fischer (1814–1859)
- Oskar Fischinger (1900–1967)
- Arthur Fitger (1840–1909)
- Ferdinand Wolfgang Flachenecker (1792–1847)
- Albert Flamm (1823–1906)
- Georg Flegel (1566–1638)
- François Fleischbein (1804–1868)
- Lutz Fleischer (1956–2019)
- Max Fleischer (1861–1930)
- Adolf Fleischmann (1892–1968)
- Gerlach Flicke (fl. 1545–1558)
- Fedor Flinzer (1832–1911)
- Gisbert Flüggen (1811–1859)
- Josef Flüggen (1842–1906)
- Daniel Fohr (1801–1862)
- Karl Philipp Fohr (1795–1818)
- Philipp von Foltz (1805–1877)
- Günther Förg (1952–2013)
- Ernst Joachim Förster (1800–1885)
- Arnold Forstmann (1842–c. 1914)
- Hans Ulrich Franck (1603–1675)
- Philipp Franck (1860–1944)
- Meister Francke (c. 1380–c. 1440)
- Michael Sigismund Frank (1770–1847)
- Eduard Frederich (1813–1864)
- Hermann Freese (1813–1871)
- Otto Freundlich (1878–1943)
- Max Frey (1874–1944)
- Maria Elektrine von Freyberg (1797–1847)
- Heinrich Jakob Fried (1802–1870)
- Caroline Friederike Friedrich (1749–1815)
- Caspar David Friedrich (1774–1840)
- Fred Friedrich (born 1943)
- Woldemar Friedrich (1846–1910)
- Fritz Friedrichs (1882–1928)
- Bernhard Fries (1820–1879)
- Ernst Fries (1801–1833)
- Karl Friedrich Fries (1831–1871)
- Richard Friese (1854–1918)
- Johann Christoph Frisch (1737–1815)
- Karl Ludwig Frommel (1789–1863)
- Günter Fruhtrunk (1923–1982)
- Ulrich Füetrer (c. 1450–1496/1500)
- Heinrich Füger (1751–1818)
- Hinrik Funhof (?–1485)
- Edmund Fürst (1874–1955)
- Klaus Fußmann (born 1938)
- Conrad Fyoll (fl. 1464–1476)

== G ==
- Eduard Gaertner (1801–1877)
- Bernd Erich Gall (born 1956)
- Tatjana Gamerith (1919–2021)
- Franz Gareis (1775–1803)
- Friedrich Gärtner (1824–1905)
- Heinrich Gärtner (1828–1909)
- Anna Rosina de Gasc (1713–1783)
- Karl Gatermann the Elder (1883–1959)
- Karl Gatermann the Younger (1909–1992)
- Jakob Gauermann (1773–1843)
- Ernst Gebauer (1782–1865)
- Eduard von Gebhardt (1838–1925)
- Josef Anton Gegenbauer (1800–1876)
- Otto Geigenberger (1881–1946)
- Rupprecht Geiger (1908–2009)
- Willi Geiger (1878–1971)
- Carl Geist (1870–1931)
- Bonaventura Genelli (1798–1868)
- Hanns Georgi (1901–1989)
- Ludger Gerdes (1954–2008)
- Till Gerhard (born 1971)
- Ida Gerhardi (1862–1927)
- Eduard Gerhardt (1813–1888)
- Anna Gerresheim (1852–1921)
- Ludwig Geyer (1779–1821)
- Hans Freiherr von Geyer zu Lauf (1895–1959)
- Torben Giehler (born 1973)
- Werner Gilles (1894–1961)
- Julius E.F. Gipkens (1883–1968)
- Joseph Anton Glantschnigg (1695–1750)
- Erich Glas (1897–1973)
- Horst Gläsker (born 1949)
- Ludwig von Gleichen-Rußwurm (1836–1901)
- Otto Gleichmann (1887–1963)
- Hermann Glöckner (1889–1987)
- Paul Salvator Goldengreen (born 1960)
- Hilde Goldschmidt (1897–1980)
- Dieter Goltzsche (born 1934)
- Paul Gösch (1885–1940)
- Karl Otto Götz (1914–2017)
- Leo Götz (1883–1962)
- Jakob Götzenberger (1802–1866)
- Carl Götzloff (1799–1866)
- Henry Gowa (1902–1990)
- Gustav Graef (1821–1895)
- Peter Graf (born 1937)
- Albert Gräfle (1809–1889)
- August Grahl (1791–1868)
- Walter Gramatté (1897–1929)
- Fritz Grasshoff (1913–1997)
- Gotthard Graubner (1930–2013)
- Otto Greiner (1869–1916)
- Fritz Greve (1863–1931)
- Otto Griebel (1895–1972)
- Christian Griepenkerl (1839–1912)
- HAP Grieshaber (1909–1981)
- Ludwig Emil Grimm (1790–1863)
- Friedrich Carl Gröger (1766–1838)
- Carl Grossberg (1894–1940)
- Theodor Grosse (1829–1891)
- George Grosz (1893–1959)
- Michael Gruber (born 1965)
- Hans Grundig (1901–1958)
- Emil Otto Grundmann (1844–1890)
- Matthias Grünewald (c. 1470–1528)
- Jakob Grünenwald(1821–1896)
- Eduard von Grützner (1846–1925)
- Richard Guhr (1873–1956)
- Louis Gurlitt (1812–1897)
- Karl Gussow (1843–1907)

== H ==
- Carl Haag (1820–1915)
- August Haake (1889–1915)
- Hugo von Habermann (1849–1929)
- Wenzel Hablik (1881–1934)
- Jakob Philipp Hackert (1737–1807)
- Gabriel von Hackl (1843–1926)
- Karl Hagedorn (1922–2005)
- Karl Hagemeister (1848–1933)
- Theodor Hagen (1842–1919)
- Ludwig von Hagn (1820–1898)
- Magda Hagstotz (1914–2001)
- Hubert Haider (1879–1971)
- Karl Michael Haider (1846–1912)
- Jost Haller (fl. 1440−1470)
- Christian Gottlob Hammer (1779–1864)
- Alois Hanslian (born 1943)
- Johann Gottlieb Hantzsch (1794–1848)
- Heinrich Harder (1858–1935)
- Fritz Harnest (1905–1999)
- Hans Hartung (1904–1989)
- Petre Hârtopeanu (1913–2001)
- Wilhelm Hasemann (1850–1913)
- Carl Hasenpflug (1802–1858)
- Max Haushofer (1811–1866)
- Eberhard Havekost (1967–2019)
- John Heartfield (1891–1968)
- Erich Heckel (1883–1970)
- Jakob Hecker (1897–1969)
- Michael Heckert (born 1950)
- Elise Neumann Hedinger (1854–1923)
- Carl Wilhelm von Heideck (1788–1861)
- Wilhelm Heine (1827–1885)
- Bettina Heinen-Ayech (1937–2020)
- Thilo Heinzmann (born 1969)
- Johannes Heisig (born 1953)
- Werner Heldt (1904–1954)
- Wilhelm Hempfing (1886–1948)
- Hermann Hendrich (1854–1931)
- Wilhelm Hensel (1794–1861)
- Thomas Herbst (1848–1915)
- Friedrich Herlin (c. 1425/30–1500)
- Franz Georg Hermann (1692–1768)
- Marcel René von Herrfeldt (1889–1965)
- Curt Herrmann (1854–1929)
- Ludwig von Herterich (1856–1932)
- Hermann Ottomar Herzog (1832–1932)
- Heinrich Maria von Hess (1798–1863)
- Karl Hess (1801–1874)
- Peter von Hess (1792–1871)
- Carle Hessay (1911–1978)
- Philipp Friedrich von Hetsch (1758–1839)
- Werner Heuser (1880–1964)
- Adolf von Heydeck (1787–1856)
- Ernst Hildebrand (1833–1924)
- Eduard Hildebrandt (1818–1868)
- Theodor Hildebrandt (1804–1874)
- Heinrich Hiller (1846–1912)
- Ludwig Hirschfeld Mack (1893–1965)
- Rudolf Hirth du Frênes (1846–1916)
- Adolf Hitler (1889–1945)
- Dora Hitz (1856–1924)
- Hannah Höch (1889–1978)
- Paul Hoecker (1854–1910)
- Angelika Hoerle (1899–1923)
- Bernhard Hoetger (1874–1949)
- Heinrich Hofmann (1824–1911)
- Ludwig von Hofmann (1861–1945)
- Margret Hofheinz-Döring (1910–1994)
- Hans Hofmann (1880–1966)
- Otto Hofmann (1907–1996)
- Hans Holbein the Elder (c. 1460–1524)
- Hans Holbein the Younger (c. 1497–1543)
- Hans-Jörg Holubitschka (1960–2016)
- Johann Evangelist Holzer (1709–1740)
- Helene Holzman (1891–1968)
- Barbara Honigmann (born 1949)
- Bartholomäus Hopfer (1628–1699)
- Theodor Horschelt (1829–1871)
- Margarethe Hormuth-Kallmorgen (1857–1934)
- Theodor Hosemann (1807–1875)
- Woldemar Hottenroth (1802–1894)
- Karl Hubbuch (1891–1979)
- Julius Hübner (1806–1882)
- Ulrich Hübner (1872–1932)
- Juergen von Huendeberg (1922–1996)
- Carl Hummel (1821–1907)
- Maria Innocentia Hummel (1909–1946)
- Otto Hupp (1859–1949)
- Karl Hurm (1930–2019)
- Auguste Hüssener (1789–1877)

== I ==
- Berthold Imhoff (1868–1939)
- Jörg Immendorff (1945–2007)
- Eric Isenburger (1902–1994)
- Caspar Isenmann (1410–1484) (hypothetical)
- Carl G. von Iwonski (1830–1912)

== J ==
- Otto Reinhold Jacobi (1812–1901)
- Paul Emil Jacobs (1802–1866)
- Willy Jaeckel (1888–1944)
- Ferdinand Jagemann (1780–1820)
- Gustav Jäger (1808–1871)
- Karl Jäger (1888–1959)
- Michael Jäger (born 1956)
- Angelo Jank (1868–1940)
- Christian Jank (1833–1888)
- Peter Janssen (1844–1908)
- Georg Jauss (1867–1922)
- Carl Ludwig Jessen (1833–1917)
- Ernst Jordan (1883–1948)
- Rudolf Jordan (1810–1887)
- Tina Juretzek (born 1952)
- Manfred W. Jürgens (born 1956)
- Paul Juvenel the Elder (1579–1643)

== K ==
- Johann Matthias Kager (1566–1634)
- Leo Kahn (1894–1983)
- Johannes Kahrs (born 1965)
- Aris Kalaizis (born 1966)
- Leopold Graf von Kalckreuth (1855–1928)
- Maria Countess von Kalckreuth (1857–1897)
- Patrick von Kalckreuth (1892–1970)
- Friedrich Kallmorgen (1856–1924)
- Arthur Kampf (1864–1950)
- Albert Kappis (1836–1914)
- Suzan Emine Kaube (born 1942)
- Arthur Kaufmann (1888–1971)
- Hugo Kauffmann (1844–1915)
- Friedrich Kaulbach (1822–1903)
- Friedrich August von Kaulbach (1850–1920)
- Hermann von Kaulbach (1846–1909)
- Wilhelm von Kaulbach (1805–1874)
- Ferdinand Keller (1842–1922)
- Moritz Kellerhoven (1758–1830)
- George Kenner (1888–1971)
- Wolfgang Kermer (born 1935)
- Marie von Keudell (1838–1918)
- Chaim Kiewe (1912–1983)
- Wilhelm Kimmich (1897–1986)
- Martin Kippenberger (1953–1997)
- Frank Kirchbach (1859–1912)
- Günther C. Kirchberger (1928–2010)
- Alexander Kircher (1867–1939)
- Otto Kirchner (1887–1960)
- Ernst Ludwig Kirchner (1880–1938)
- Johanna Kirsch (1856–1907)
- Konrad Klapheck (1935–2023)
- Mati Klarwein (1932–2002)
- Anna Klein (1883–1941)
- Johann Adam Klein (1792–1875)
- Richard Klein (1890–1967)
- Paul Kleinschmidt (1883–1949)
- Leo von Klenze (1784–1864)
- Heinrich Kley (1863–1945)
- Max Klinger (1857–1920)
- Friedrich August von Klinkowström (1778–1835)
- Hans Kloss (1938–2018)
- Robert Klümpen (born 1973)
- Georg Klusemann (1942–1981)
- Karl Knabl (1850–1904)
- Hermann Knackfuß (1848–1915)
- Johann Zacharias Kneller (1642–1702)
- Heinrich Knirr (1862–1944)
- Imi Knoebel (born 1940)
- Hugo Knorr (1834–1904)
- Wilhelm von Kobell (1766–1853)
- Martin Kober (~1550–~1598)
- Dora Koch-Stetter (1881–1968) (aka Dora Stetter)
- Robert Koehler (1850–1917)
- Matthias Koeppel (1937–2026)
- Wilhelm von Köln (1370s?)
- Alois Kolb (1875–1942)
- Heinrich Christoph Kolbe (1771–1836)
- Helmut Kolle (1899–1931)
- Käthe Kollwitz (1867–1945)
- Max Koner (1854–1900)
- Leo von König (1871–1944)
- Emma Körner (1788–1815)
- Rudolf Kortokraks (1928–2014)
- Theodor Kotsch (1818–1884)
- Johann Peter Krafft (1780–1856)
- Lambert Krahe (1712–1790)
- August von Kreling (1819–1876)
- Robert Kretschmer (1812–1872)
- Conrad Faber von Kreuznach (c. 1500–1552/3)
- Louis Krevel (1801–1876)
- Karl Kröner (1887–1972)
- Franz Krüger (1797–1857)
- Sebastian Krüger (born 1963)
- Christiane Kubrick (born 1932)
- Gerhard von Kügelgen (1772–1820)
- Karl von Kügelgen (1772–1832)
- Wilhelm von Kügelgen (1802–1867)
- Gotthardt Kuehl (1850–1915)
- Ingo Kühl (born 1953)
- Friedrich Wilhelm Kuhnert (1865–1926)
- Konrad Kujau (1938–2000)
- Friedrich Kunath (born 1974)

== L ==
- Curt Lahs (1893–1958)
- Mark Lammert (born 1960)
- Christian Landenberger (1862–1927)
- Friedrich Lange (1834–1875)
- Joseph Lange (1751–1831)
- Julius Lange (1817–1878)
- Arthur Langhammer (1854–1901)
- Rainer Maria Latzke (born 1950)
- Richard Lauchert (1823–1868)
- Paul Lautensack (1478–1558)
- Rudolf Lehmann (1819–1905)
- Hildegard Lehnert (1857–1943)
- Fridolin Leiber (1853–1912)
- Walter Leistikow (1865–1908)
- Ulrich Leman (1885–1988)
- August Lemmer (1862–?)
- Franz von Lenbach (1836–1904)
- Reinhold Lepsius (1857–1922)
- Sabine Lepsius (1864–1942)
- Karl Friedrich Lessing (1808–1880)
- Wolfgang Lettl (1919–2008)
- August Leu (1818–1897)
- Emanuel Leutze (1816–1868)
- Sophie Ley (1849–1918)
- Carl Julius von Leypold (1806–1874)
- Wilhelm Lichtenheld (1817–1891)
- Max Liebermann (1847–1935)
- Adolf Heinrich Lier (1826–1882)
- Hermann Linde (1863–1923)
- Heinrich Eduard Linde-Walther (1868–1939)
- Richard Lindner (1901–1978)
- Karl Friedrich Lippmann (1883–1957)
- Emmy Lischke (1860–1919)
- Clara Lobedan (1840–1918)
- Stefan Lochner (c. 1410–1451)
- Käthe Loewenthal (1878–1942)
- August Löffler (1822–1866)
- Ludwig von Löfftz (1845–1910)
- Max Lohde (1845–1868)
- Otto Lohmüller (born 1943)
- Elfriede Lohse-Wächtler (1899–1940)
- Bernard Lokai (born 1960)
- David Lorenz (1856–1907)
- Heinrich Lossow (1843–1897)
- Károly Lotz (1833–1904)
- Margarethe Loewe-Bethe (1859–1932)
- Auguste Ludwig (1834–1901)
- Friedrich Ludwig (1895–1970)
- Jules Lunteschütz (1822–1893)
- Markus Lüpertz (born 1941)
- Vilma Lwoff-Parlaghy (1863–1923)
- Arnold Lyongrün (1871–1935)

== M ==
- Thilo Maatsch (1900–1983)
- Heinz Mack (born 1931)
- August Macke (1887–1914)
- Fritz Mackensen (1866–1953)
- Josef Madlener (1881–1967)
- Alfred Mahlau (1894–1967)
- Carl Malchin (1838–1923)
- Christian Mali (1832–1906)
- Lothar Malskat (1913–1988)
- Jeanne Mammen (1890–1976)
- Henriette Manigk (born 1968)
- Johann Christian von Mannlich (1741–1822)
- Jean Mannheim (1863–1945) German-born American
- Ludwig Manzel (1858–1936)
- Franz Marc (1880–1916)
- Hans von Marées (1837–1887)
- Carl von Marr (1858–1936)
- Jacob Marrel (1613/4?–1681)
- Johannes Martini (1866–1935)
- Master of the Arboga altarpiece (fl. 1490–1525)
- Master of the Drapery Studies (Heinrich Lützelmann) (fl. 1470–1500)
- Master of the Karlsruhe Passion (Hans Hirtz?) (fl. 1421–1463)
- Master of the Saint Bartholomew Altarpiece (fl. 1475–1510)
- Fritz Maurischat (1893–1986)
- Louis Mayer (1791–1843)
- Jonathan Meese (born 1970)
- Lothar Meggendorfer (1847–1925)
- Ludwig Meidner (1884–1966)
- Else Meidner (1901–1987)
- Georg Meistermann (1911–1990)
- Hans Memling (c. 1430–1494)
- Peter Menne (born 1960)
- Carlo Mense (1886–1965)
- Adolph Menzel (1815–1905)
- Joseph Anton Merz (1681–1750)
- Pius Ferdinand Messerschmitt (1858–1915)
- Friedrich Eduard Meyerheim (1808–1879)
- Paul Friedrich Meyerheim (1842–1915)
- Abraham Mignon (1640–1679)
- Carl Julius Milde (1803–1875)
- Amud Uwe Millies (1932–2008)
- Paula Modersohn-Becker (1876–1907)
- Manfred Mohr (born 1938)
- Christian Ernst Bernhard Morgenstern (1805–1867)
- Wilhelm Morgner (1891–1917)
- Sabine Moritz (born 1969)
- Friedrich Mosbrugger (1804–1830)
- Adolf Mosengel (1837–1885)
- Georg Muche (1895–1987)
- Heinrich Mücke (1806–1891)
- Otto Mueller (1874–1930)
- Armin Mueller-Stahl (born 1930)
- Georg Mühlberg (1863–1925)
- Fritz Mühlenweg (1898–1961)
- Andreas Müller (1811–1890)
- Heiko Müller (born 1968)
- Maler Müller (1749–1825)
- Otto Müller (1898–1979)
- Victor Müller (1829–1871)
- Paul Müller-Kaempff (1861–1941)
- Gabriele Münter (1877–1962)
- Gustav Mützel (1839–1893)
- Johan van den Mynnesten (c. 1440–1504)

== N ==
- Charles Christian Nahl (1818–1878)
- Hugo Wilhelm Arthur Nahl (1833–1889)
- Thomas von Nathusius (1866–1904)
- August Natterer (1868–1933)
- Julius Naue (1835–1907)
- Ernst Wilhelm Nay (1902–1968)
- Carl Nebel (1805–1855)
- Otto Nebel (1892–1973)
- Bernhard von Neher (1806–1886)
- Rolf Nesch (1893–1975)
- Caspar Netscher (1639–1684)
- Gert Neuhaus (born 1939)
- Andrea Neumann (1969–2020)
- Eugen Napoleon Neureuther (1806–1882)
- Jo Niemeyer (born 1946)
- Wilhelm Theodor Nocken (1830–1905)
- Emil Nolde (1867–1956)
- Franz Nölken (1884–1918)
- Bernt Notke (1435–1508/09?)
- Felix Nussbaum (1904–1944)

== O ==
- Franz Ignaz Oefele (1721–1797)
- Ernst Erwin Oehme (1831–1907)
- Ernst Ferdinand Oehme (1797–1855)
- August Friedrich Oelenhainz (1745–1804)
- Theobald von Oer (1807–1885)
- Hans Olde (1855–1917)
- Friedrich von Olivier (1791–1859)
- Walter Ophey (1882–1930)
- Ernst Oppler (1867–1929)
- David Ostrowski (born 1981)
- Friedrich Overbeck (1789–1869)
- Gerta Overbeck (1898-1977)

== P ==
- Amalia Pachelbel (1688–1723)
- Blinky Palermo (1943–1977)
- Otto Pankok (1893–1966)
- Louise von Panhuys (1763–1844)
- Jürgen Partenheimer (born 1947)
- Eduard Pechuel-Loesche (1840–1913)
- Werner Peiner (1897–1984)
- A. R. Penck (1939–2017)
- Carl Gottlieb Peschel (1798–1879)
- Johann Anton de Peters (1725–1795)
- Heinrich Petersen-Angeln (1850–1906)
- Wolfgang Petrick (1939–2025)
- Johann Baptist Pflug (1785–1866)
- Martin Erich Philipp (1887–1978)
- Otto Piene (1928–2014)
- Ludwig Pietsch (1824–1911)
- Bruno Piglhein (1848–1894)
- Carl Theodor von Piloty (1826–1886)
- Hartmut Piniek (born 1950)
- Theodor Pixis (1831–1907)
- Oscar Pletsch (1830–1888)
- Hermann Pleuer (1863–1911)
- Bernhard Plockhorst (1825–1907)
- Alois Plum (1935–2024)
- Tobias Pock (1609–1683)
- Leon Pohle (1841–1908)
- Sigmar Polke (1941–2010)
- Heinrich Pommerencke (1821–1873)
- Eduard Wilhelm Pose (1812–1878)
- Michael Mathias Prechtl (1926–2003)
- Johann Daniel Preissler (1666–1737)
- Hermann Prell (1854–1922)
- Hermione von Preuschen (1854–1918)
- Heimrad Prem (1934–1978)
- Johann Georg Primavesi (1774–1855)
- Hans Purrmann (1880–1966)
- Doramaria Purschian (1890–1972)

== Q ==
- Franz Quaglio (1844–1920)
- Simon Quaglio (1795–1878)
- Silvia Quandt (born 1937)
- Fritz Quant (1888–1933)
- Otto Quante (1875–1947)
- Curt Querner (1904–1976)
- Tobias Querfurt (1660–1734)

== R ==
- Doris Raab (1851–1933)
- Johann Leonhard Raab (1825–1899)
- Johann Heinrich Ramberg (1763–1840)
- Johann Anton Ramboux (1790–1866)
- Lilo Ramdohr (1913–2013)
- Lilo Rasch-Naegele (1914–1978)
- Neo Rauch (born 1960)
- Robert Hermann Raudner (1854–1915)
- Karl Raupp (1837–1918)
- Christopher Rave (1881–1933)
- Hilla von Rebay (1890–1967)
- Anita Rée (1885–1933)
- Willy Reetz (1892–1963)
- Theodor Rehbenitz (1791–1861)
- Elke Rehder (born 1953)
- Carl Theodor Reiffenstein (1820–1893)
- Johann Friedrich Reiffenstein (1719–1793)
- Heinrich Reinhold (1788–1825)
- Robert Reinick (1805–1852)
- Carl Reinhardt (1818–1877)
- Rudolf Reschreiter (1868–1938)
- Karl Lorenz Rettich (1841–1904)
- Moritz Retzsch (1779–1857)
- Gerhardt Wilhelm von Reutern (1794–1865)
- Ottilie Reylaender (1882–1965)
- Gustav Richter (1823–1884)
- Hans Richter (1888–1976)
- Adrian Ludwig Richter (1803–1884)
- Gerhard Richter (born 1932)
- Johann Elias Ridinger (1698–1767)
- August Riedel (1799–1883)
- Franz Riepenhausen (1786–1831)
- Johannes Riepenhausen (1787–1860)
- Johann Christoph Rincklake (1764–1813)
- Joachim Ringelnatz (1883–1934)
- Wilhelm Ripe (1818–1885)
- Otto Ritschl (1860–1944)
- Paul Ritter (1829–1907)
- Günter Rittner (1927–2020)
- Lorenz Ritter (1832–1921)
- Hartmut Ritzerfeld (1950–2024)
- Theodor Rocholl (1854–1933)
- Carl Röchling (1855–1920)
- Bernhard Rode (1725–1797)
- Hermen Rode (c. 1468–c. 1504)
- Carl Rodeck (1841–1909)
- Ottilie Roederstein (1859–1937)
- Nicholas Roerich (1874–1947)
- Julius Roeting (1822–1896)
- Johann Martin von Rohden (1778–1868)
- Stefan Roloff (born 1953)
- Johann Heinrich Roos (1631–1685)
- Johann Melchior Roos (1663–1731)
- Philipp Peter Roos (1655–1706)
- Theodor Roos (1638–1698)
- Ludwig Rosenfelder (1813–1881)
- Walter Alfred Rosam (1883–1916)
- Mike Rose (1932–2006)
- Waldemar Rösler (1882–1916)
- Kurt Roth (1899–1975)
- Ferdinand Rothbart (1823–1899)
- Johannes Rottenhammer (1564–1625)
- Christian Ruben (1805–1875)
- Dieter Rübsaamen (born 1937)
- Georg Philipp Rugendas (1666–1742)
- Hans Hinrich Rundt (c. 1660–c. 1750)
- Philipp Otto Runge (1777–1810)
- Heinrich von Rustige (1810–1900)

== S ==
- Georg Saal (1817–1870)
- Rolf Sackenheim (1921–2006)
- Hubert Salentin (1822–1910)
- Charlotte Salomon (1917–1943)
- Joachim von Sandrart (1606–1688)
- Georg Sauter (1866–1937)
- Wilhelm Sauter (1896–1948)
- Käte Schaller-Härlin (1877–1973)
- Thomas Scheibitz (born 1968)
- Wolfram Adalbert Scheffler (born 1956)
- Auguste Schepp (1846–1905)
- Osmar Schindler (1867–1927)
- Adolf Schinnerer (1876–1949)
- Johann Wilhelm Schirmer (1807–1863)
- Wilhelm Schirmer (1802–1866)
- Eduard Schleich the Elder (1812–1874)
- Oskar Schlemmer (1888–1943)
- Thea Schleusner (1879–1964)
- Hans-Jürgen Schlieker (1924–2004)
- Eberhard Schlotter (1921–2014)
- Torsten Schlüter (born 1959)
- Georg Friedrich Schmidt (1712–1775)
- Joost Schmidt (1893–1948)
- Julia Schmidt (born 1976)
- Jürgen Schmitt (born 1949)
- Max Schmidt (1818–1901)
- Gerda Schmidt-Panknin (1920–2021)
- Karl Schmidt-Rottluff (1884–1976)
- Ruth Schmidt Stockhausen (1922–2014)
- Marc Schmitz (born 1963)
- Carl Schmitz-Pleis (1877–1943)
- Bertha Schrader (1845–1920)
- Leopold Schmutzler (1864–1940)
- Friedrich Schneider (1786–1853)
- Paul Schneider (1884–1969)
- Sascha Schneider (1870–1927)
- Joseph Anton Schneiderfranken (1876–1943)
- Julius Schnorr von Carolsfeld (1794–1872)
- Otto Scholderer (1834–1902)
- Georg Scholz (1890–1945)
- Karl Schorn (1803–1850)
- Ludwig Schongauer (c. 1440–1494)
- Johann Heinrich Schönfeld (1609–1684)
- Julius Schoppe (1795–1868)
- Georg Schrimpf (1889–1938)
- Adolf Schreyer (1828–1899)
- Lothar Schreyer (1886–1966)
- Hans Schröder (1931–2010)
- Werner Schramm (1898–1970)
- Liselotte Schramm-Heckmann (1904–1995)
- Daniel Schultz (1615–1683)
- Bernard Schultze (1915–2005)
- Fritz W. Schulz (1884–1962)
- Emil Schumacher (1912–1999)
- Wilhelm Schütze (1807–1878)
- Fritz Schwegler (1935–2014)
- Carlos Schwabe (1866–1926)
- Otto Schwerdgeburth (1835–1866)
- Martel Schwichtenberg (1896–1945)
- Kurt Schwitters (1887–1948)
- Lothar von Seebach (1853–1930)
- Adolf Seel (1829–1907)
- Else Sehrig-Vehling (1897–1994)
- Louise Seidler (1786–1866)
- Joseph Anton Settegast (1813–1890)
- Christian Seybold (1695–1768)
- Oskar Seyffert (1862–1940)
- Arthur Siebelist (1870–1945)
- Clara Siewert (1862–1945)
- Ludovike Simanowiz (1759–1827)
- Richard Simon (1898–1993)
- Franz Skarbina (1849–1910)
- Dirk Skreber (born 1961)
- Maria Slavona (1865–1931)
- Max Slevogt (1868–1932)
- Karl Ferdinand Sohn (1805–1867)
- Karl Rudolf Sohn (1845–1908)
- Richard Sohn (1834–1912)
- Wilhelm Sohn (1830–1899)
- Alfred Sohn-Rethel (1875–1958)
- Else Sohn-Rethel (1853–1933)
- Karli Sohn-Rethel (1882–1966)
- Otto Sohn-Rethel (1877–1949)
- Daniel Soreau (c. 1560–1619)
- Isaak Soreau (1604–1644)
- Michael Sowa (born 1945)
- August Specht (1849–1923)
- Friedrich Specht (1839–1909)
- Erwin Speckter (1806–1835)
- Johann Sperl (1840–1914)
- Walter Spies (1895–1942)
- Eugene Spiro (1874–1972)
- Carl Spitzweg (1808–1885)
- Hans Springinklee (c. 1490/5–c. 1540)
- Gertrud Staats (1859–1938)
- Anton Stankowski (1906–1998)
- Carl Steffeck (1818–1890)
- Jakob Steinhardt (1887–1968)
- Hermann Stenner (1891–1914)
- David D. Stern (born 1956)
- Robert Sterl (1867–1932)
- Joseph Karl Stieler (1781–1858)
- Franz Seraph Stirnbrand (c. 1788/94–1882)
- Dora Stock (1760–1832)
- Minna Stocks (1846–1928)
- Curt Stoermer (1891–1976)
- Fritz Stoltenberg (1855–1921)
- Eva Stort (1855–1936)
- Sebastian Stoskopff (1597–1657)
- Willy Stöwer (1864–1931)
- Paul Strecker (1898–1950)
- Bernhard Strigel (c. 1461–1528)
- Helene Marie Stromeyer (1834–1924)
- Hermann Struck (1876–1944)
- Franz von Stuck (1863–1928)
- Fritz Stuckenberg (1881–1944)
- Absolon Stumme (?–1499)
- Emil Stumpp (1886–1941)
- Helmut Sturm (1932–2008)
- Rudolph Suhrlandt (1781–1862)
- Florian Süssmayr (born 1963)
- Stefan Szczesny (born 1951)

== T ==
- Ruben Talberg (born 1964)
- Wilhelm Ternite (1786–1871)
- Ebba Tesdorpf (1851–1920)
- Heinz Tetzner (1920–2007)
- Anna Dorothea Therbusch (1721–1782)
- Arthur Thiele (1860–1936)
- Ludwig Thiersch (1825–1909)
- Hans Thoma (1839–1924)
- Paul Thumann (1834–1908)
- Johann Heinrich Tischbein (1722–1789)
- Johann Jacob Tischbein (1725–1791)
- Johann Valentin Tischbein (1715–1768)
- Ernst Toepfer (1877–1955)
- Christiaan Tonnis (born 1956)
- Gero Trauth (born 1942)
- Hann Trier (1915–1999)
- Wilhelm Trübner (1851–1917)

== U ==
- Otto Ubbelohde (1867–1922)
- Günther Uecker (1930–2025)
- Philipp Uffenbach (1566–1636)
- Fritz von Uhde (1848–1911)
- Maria Uhden (1892–1918)
- Fred Uhlman (1901–1985)
- Lesser Ury (1861–1931)
- Adolf Uzarski (1885–1970)

== V ==
- Johannes Veit (1790–1854)
- Philipp Veit (1793–1877)
- Henry Vianden (1814–1899)
- Clara Vogedes (1892–1983)
- Hugo Vogel (1855–1934)
- Heinrich Vogeler (1872–1942)
- Carl Christian Vogel von Vogelstein (1788–1868)
- Karl Völker (1889–1962)
- Max Volkhart (1848–1924)
- Adolph Friedrich Vollmer (1806–1875)
- Friedrich Voltz (1817–1886)
- Johann Michael Voltz (1784–1858)
- Friedrich Vordemberge-Gildewart (1899–1962)
- Wolf Vostell (1932–1998)

== W ==
- Karl Wilhelm Wach (1787–1845)
- Friedrich Wachenhusen (1859–1925)
- Carl Wagner (1796–1867)
- Johann Salomon Wahl (1689–1765)
- Paul Wallat (1879–1964)
- Horst Walter (1936–2012)
- Petrus Wandrey (1939–2012)
- Corinne Wasmuht (born 1964)
- Max Peiffer Watenphul (1896–1976)
- August Weber (1817–1873)
- Felix Weber (born 1965)
- Paul Weber (1823–1916)
- Johannes Wechtlin (c. 1480–?)
- Karl Weinmair (1906–1944)
- Friedrich Georg Weitsch (1758–1828)
- Theodor Leopold Weller (1802–1880)
- Gottlieb Welté (1745–1792)
- Anton von Werner (1843–1915)
- Eberhard Werner (1924–2002)
- Brigitta Westphal (born 1944)
- Friedrich Bernhard Westphal (1803–1844)
- Sascha Wiederhold (1904–1962)
- Christian Wilberg (1839–1882)
- Ludwig Wilding (1927–2010)
- August von Wille (1828–1887)
- Michael Willmann (1630–1706)
- Albert Windisch (1878–1967)
- Fritz Winter (1905–1976)
- Harald Winter (born 1953)
- Franz Xaver Winterhalter (1805–1873)
- Hermann Wislicenus (1825–1899)
- Adolf Wissel (1894–1973)
- Johann Michael Wittmer (1802–1880)
- Edmund Wodick (1816–1886)
- Christoph Wilhelm Wohlien (1811–1869)
- Karla Woisnitza (born 1952)
- Julie Wolfthorn (1864–1944)
- Joseph Wolf (1820–1899)
- Balduin Wolff (1819–1907)
- Wolfgang Wolff (1909–1994)
- Michael Wolgemut (1434–1519)
- Gert Heinrich Wollheim (1894–1974)
- Walter Womacka (1925–2010)
- Georg Philipp Wörlen (1886–1954)
- Franz Wulfhagen (c. 1624–1670)
- Paul Wunderlich (1927–2010)
- Noah Wunsch (born 1970)
- Nicholas Wurmser (1298–1367)

== Z ==
- Erich Zander (1889–1965)
- Herbert Zangs (1924–2003)
- Ernst Zehle (1876–1940)
- Johann Eleazar Zeissig (1737–1806)
- Bartholomäus Zeitblom (c. 1450–c. 1519)
- Wolfgang Zelmer (born 1948)
- Alexander Zick (1845–1907)
- Januarius Zick (1730–1797)
- Adolf Ziegler (1892–1959)
- Hans-Peter Zimmer (1936–1992)
- Adolf Zimmermann (1799–1859)
- Albert Zimmermann (1808–1888)
- Clemens von Zimmermann (1788–1869)
- Johann Baptist Zimmermann (1680–1758)
- Max Zimmermann (1811–1878)
- Reinhard Sebastian Zimmermann (1815–1893)
- Richard Zimmermann (1820–1875)
- Robert Zimmermann (1815–1864)
- Thomas Zipp (1966–2026)
- Heinrich von Zügel (1850–1941)
- Anton Zwengauer (1810–1884)
- Anton Georg Zwengauer (1850–1928)
- Gustav Philipp Zwinger (1779–1819)
- Oskar Zwintscher (1870–1916)

== See also ==
- Category:German painters
- List of German artists – including all visual and plastic arts
- List of German women artists
