= Carl Engel (disambiguation) =

Carl Engel (1883–1944), was an American pianist.

Carl Engel may also refer to:

- Carl Engel (musicologist) (1818–1882), an English musicologist
- Carl Ludvig Engel (1778–1840), a German architect

== See also ==
- Carl Engel von der Rabenau (1817–1870), a German painter
- Karl Engel (Austrian footballer)
- Karl Engel (Swiss footballer)
