= Karl Fries =

Karl Fries is the name of:

- Karl Friedrich Fries (1831–1871), German painter
- Karl Theophil Fries (1875–1962), German chemist
