= Udo Dziersk =

German painter

Udo Dziersk (born Gelsenkirchen, 1961) is a contemporary German painter.

Since 2002 Udo Dziersk has been professor of the Orientierungs-Bereich at the Kunstakademie Düsseldorf, mentoring newcomers of the student body before they assume their direction by joining a class. He was a student at the academy under Gerhard Richter and later Markus Lüpertz from 1983 to 1988 and did studies aside with Per Kirkeby and Georg Baselitz. His works are often inspired by the experiences and impressions of his extensive travels around the world, though as cultural stimulus for what develops from sketches to canvas.

== See also ==
- List of German painters
