= Christian Brod =

German painter

Christian Brod (1917 in Oranienburg – 2012 in Berlin) was a German painter whose work was discovered by his cousin Otto Brod in 2012. In Christian Brod's Berlin apartment a number of documents were found which stated that the artist was associated with several members of the Nazi Party, including Adolf Hitler. Portraits of Heinrich Himmler, Gerd von Rundstedt and Albrecht Mertz von Quirnheim were found by cousin Otto Brod.

Not registered in the database of the Reichskulturkammer, Christian Brod remains a mystery to art historians. However, Adolf Hitler's signature on Christian Brod's invoice, is proven to be authentic.

From November 2012 until April 2013 several Dutch news media covered the Christian Brod art show, which caused some disturbance, held in Amersfoort, The Netherlands, initiated by gallery owner, photographer and curator Ron Jagers.

Apart from the war scenes Christian Brod painted, a few political cartoons were discovered as well as a painting with the depiction of a naked Eva Braun, dated 1943. Research has proven that the paint used in making this portrait was made by IG Farben, a German company that stopped producing paint after World War II.

== See also ==
- List of German painters
