= Philipp Christfeld =

German porcelain painter

Johann Philipp Christfeld (born 1796 or 1797 – 6 January 1874) was a German porcelain painter.

Christfeld was born in Frankenthal. He is recorded as living at Lerchen Straße 42 in Munich in around 1850. Christfeld died in Munich in 1874.

== See also ==
- List of German painters
