= Friedrich August Bouterwek =

German artist

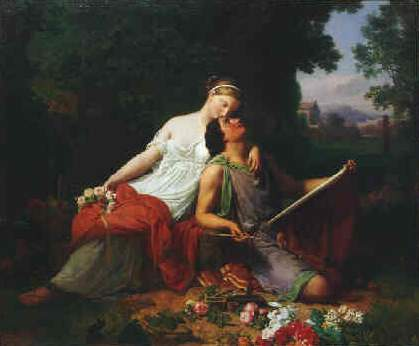
The painter and his muse

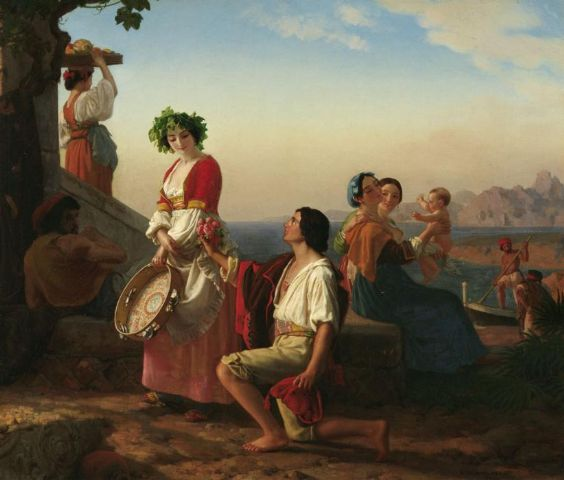
The declaration of love

Friedrich August Bouterwek (or Buterweck) was a German artist, who spent much of his life in Paris.

== Life ==
Bouterwek was born at Tarnowitz, in Silesia, in 1806. He was trained in the school of Kolbe at Berlin, and later pursued his studies under Delaroche in Paris, where he three times carried off the gold medal. In 1834 he made a tour in Italy, and later visited Spain, Scotland, and the East. After a while he moved from Berlin to Paris, where he lived for 25 years. In the course of his life he was awarded 23 medals and numerous orders. He died in Paris in 1867.

== Works ==
His works include:

- Orestes pursued by the Furies (1833).
- Borneo taking leave of Juliet(1836).
- Isaac and Rebekah (1840).
- Episode from Gamacho's Wedding.
- Jacob and Eacbel(1844).
- Baptism of the Ethiopian Eunuch (1848).
- Bridal feast of Daphnis and Chloe (1855).

== See also ==
- List of German painters
