= Eduard Frederich =

German painter

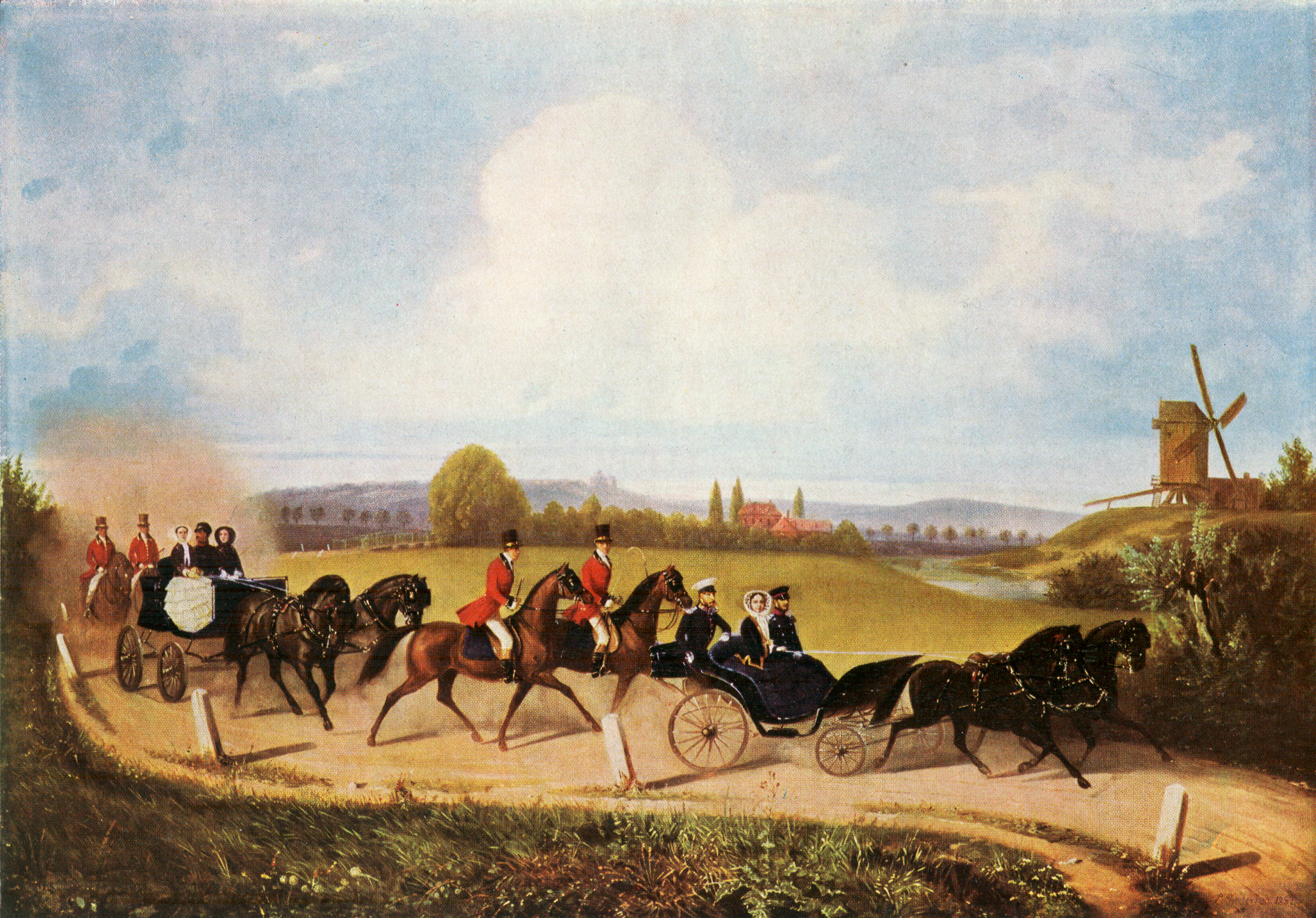
1853: "Rückkehr vom Kronsberg“ - a painting by Eduard Frederich

Eduard Frederich, born at Hanover in 1813, attended the Academy at Düsseldorf from 1836 to 1843, and studied in particular landscape and genre painting, which he, however, changed afterwards for scenes of encampments and manoeuvres. He was court painter, and died at Hanover in 1864.

== See also ==
- List of German painters
