= Caroline Friederike Friedrich =

German artist (1749–1815)

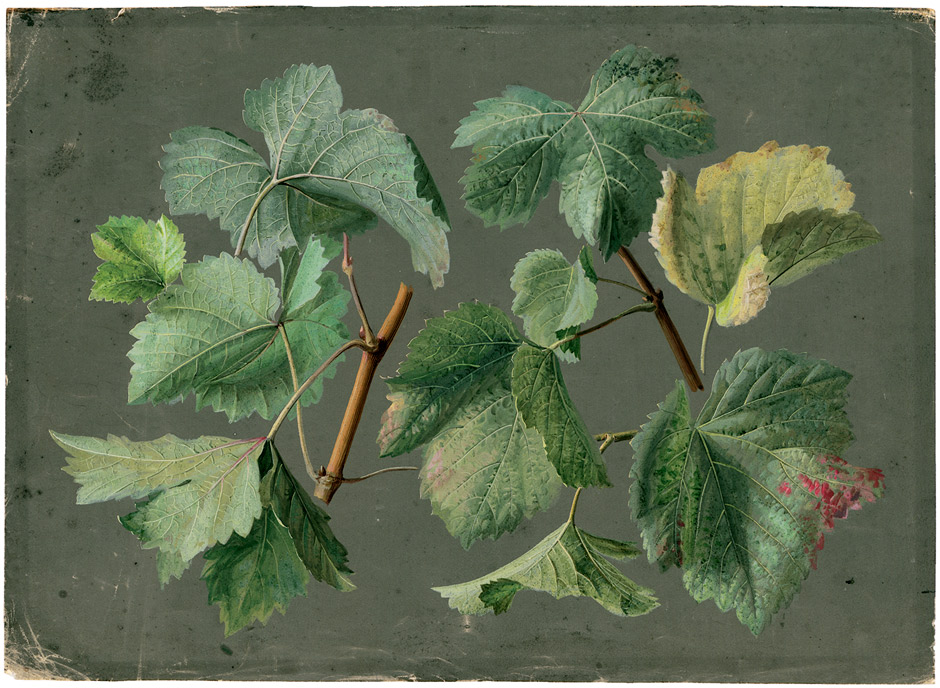
Vine leaves, attributed to Friedrich, ca. 1815

Caroline Friederike Friedrich (1749–1815) was a flower painter. She was born in Friedrichstadt near Dresden on 4 March 1749. She was court painter and a member of the Dresden Academy, and produced a number of admired bouquets in oil and watercolours. She died on 20 January 1815 in Dresden.

== See also ==
- List of German painters
