= Johann Christian Eberlein =

German painter

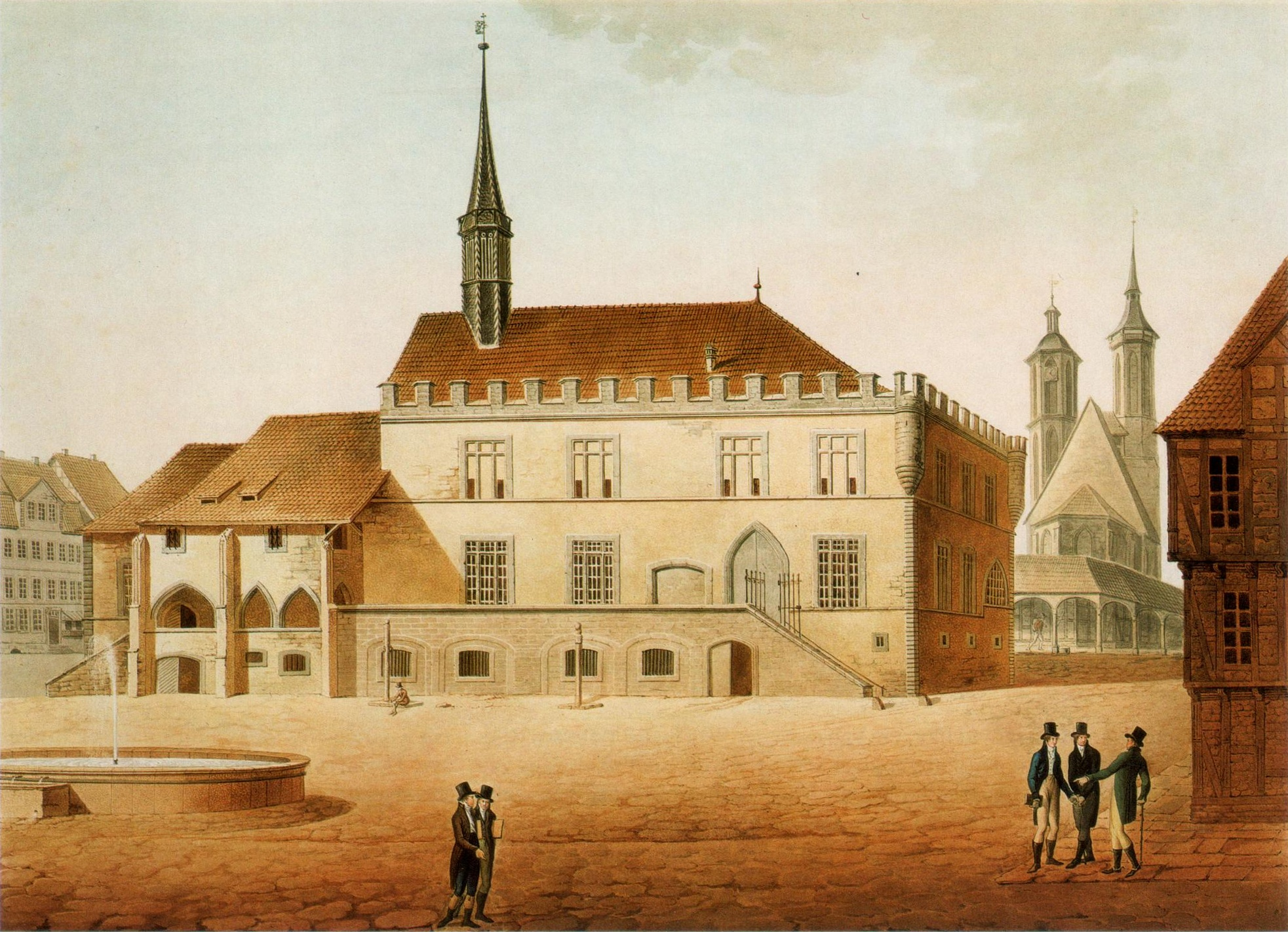
Old Town Hall of Göttingen, ca. 1800, now in the City Museum of Göttingen

Johann Christian Eberlein (ca.1770 – 1815) was a German painter who was born and died in Göttingen. An Italian Landscape by him is in the Modern Gallery at Munich.

== See also ==
- List of German painters
