= Gisela Beker =

German-born American painter (1932–2015)

Gisela U. Beker (née Sander, October 9, 1932 – April 18, 2015) was a German-born American artist and painter.

== Biography ==
Gisela U. Sander was born in Free City of Danzig on October 9, 1932. She had three sons; Erol, Brian, and Gary and a granddaughter, Molly. Queen Fabiola of Belgium promoted the first Visual International Art Exhibition of 122 artists from around the world. Beker's painting Graduation Orange received the top prize.

Beker was a U.S. citizen from 1961. She died in Daytona Beach, Florida on April 18, 2015, at the age of 82.

== See also ==
- List of German painters
