= Tobias Andreae =

German painter

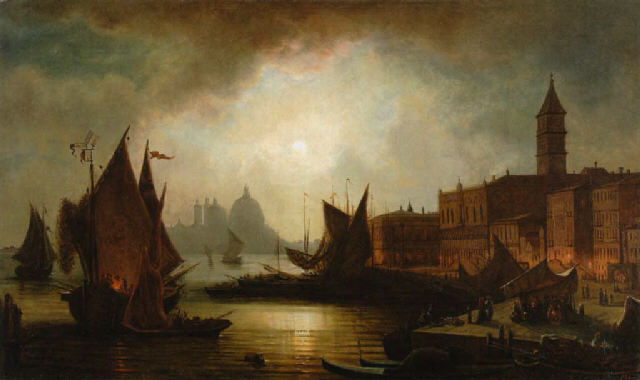
Venice by Moonlight: View from the Bacino di S. Marco, bustling with sailboats, towards the Molo on the right and S. Maria della Salute on the left, 1867

Tobias Andreae (1823–1873) was a German artist. He was born in Frankfurt-am-Main, studied under Jakob Becker, and then went to Munich, where he made the acquaintance of Carl Rahl and Bonaventura Genelli. In 1853 he visited Italy, and painted landscapes, into which he occasionally introduced moonlight effects. Andreae died in Munich in 1873.

== See also ==
- List of German painters
