= Otto Gleichmann =

German artist

Otto Gleichmann (20 August 1887, in Mainz – 2 November 1963, in Hannover) was a key figure in German expressionism. He produced oil paintings, watercolor paintings, sketches, lithographs and pictures in mixed media.

His works from the 1920s and 1930s were characterised by his bad experiences as a soldier (1915) and his injuries (1916) during the First World War - and his belief that the growth of National Socialism was a bad thing.

He took part in the Hannoversche Sezession from 1918, where he met Kurt Schwitters, among others, and became friends with Theodor Däubler. His exhibition was banned, and he was named a degenerate artist in 1938.

== Work and exhibitions ==
- Selbstbildnis (self-portrait) 1913, Pencil on paper
- Sturm Herrschaften () 1915, Pencil on paper
- Irrenparadies II (), 1918, Pencil on paper
- Strahlen - Stuerzen (Lines/Rays) Oil on canvas, 1920
- Vor dunkler Landschaft (Against the darker landscape) Oil on canvas, 1920
- Unfassbar, unfasslich sind ihm die Dinge (inconceivable are things for him), Pen and watercolour on paper, 1920
- Kopf einer Greisin () Mixed media, 1927
- Leichenschmaus, 1925

== See also ==
- List of German painters
