= Till Gerhard =

German artist

Till Gerhard (born 1971) is a German artist based in Hamburg.

== Life and work ==
Till Gerhard was born in Hamburg, Germany. He studied at Muthesius Hochschule fur Kunst und Gestaltung, Kiel (1992–93) and the Hochschule fur angewandte Wissenschaften, FB Gestaltung Professor Dieter Glasmacher, Hamburg (1993–1998).

Gerhard paints large-scale canvases of rural communities, but with an unsettling atmosphere. Images include a cabin in the woods or a skyline dotted with refineries. He uses delicate spills of colour and heavy brushwork, as well as drips, splashes and smears.

He has exhibited in shows including Ohne uns hatte man Beton at SKAMraum, Hamburg, Nerdism at Zeughaus, Hamburg and Ein Tag, Ein Raum, Ein Bild at Sebastien Fath Contemporary in Mannheim. Gerhard has shown at the San Francisco Museum of Modern Art, Arndt & Partner in Zurich and Stellan Holm Gallery in New York.

He is represented by Stellan Holm [Gallery New York], Galleri K in Oslo and Ikon Ltd. in California.

== See also ==
- List of German painters
