= Georg Bergmann =

German painter (1821–1870)

Georg Bergmann (1821–1870) was a German painter of historical subjects and portraits.

== Life ==
Bergmann was born at Celle, near Hanover, in 1821. He studied under Theodor Hildebrandt at the Düsseldorf Academy from 1843 to 1847. Having finished his studies, he lived until 1852 in his parents house near St Michael's church in Hildesheim. In 1853 he moved to Hanover where he became a court painter, but often returned to Hildesheim. He devoted his later years mostly to portrait painting.

In 1851 he carried out a set of wall-paintings, depicting "The Saga of Thedel of Wallmoden" at Wallmoden Castle near Goslar, and in the same year painted The Last Moments of Philip II, King of Spain (formerly at Leipzig, lost since 1945 ). His depiction of The Death of Emperor Karl V in the Monastery of St Juste (1854) was purchased by the King of Hanover. It was rediscovered following its sale as an unattributed work at an auction of property from Schloss Marienburg near Hildesheim in 2005. Other known works by Bergmann are a Mother and Child (1847), a Madonna and Child (1850) and a watercolour recording the medieval painted ceiling of the church of St Michael in Hildesheim.

He died in 1870.

== See also ==
- List of German painters
