= Heinz Budweg =

German painter (born 1940)

- Born: 1 May 1940 (age 86); Berlin, Germany
- Died: 4 November 2025
- Known for: Painting

Heinz Budweg (born 1 May 1940) is a German painter who resided in São Paulo, Brazil. Budweg was considered the best artists in the speciality of painting the Indians of the Amazon Forest.

== Early life and career ==
Born in Berlin, Germany in 1940, Budweg immigrated to Brazil in 1953. He established himself in São Paulo, and he immediately started to demonstrate interest in the Brazilian Indian population. He has traveled many times to the Amazon Forest, as well as the Alto Xingu and the Marajó Island, always to look for inspiration. He has painted a vast collection of Indians portraits. He also won a Jabuti Trophy, one of the most prestigious awards in Brazil, thanks to his work in Lendas Brasileiras (Brazilian Legends), a book dedicated for children.

He became a Brazilian citizen in 1958.

His work was exhibited in Brazil, Germany, Italy, the United States and Switzerland. Some of his paintings are permanently exposed in the Munich Art-Gallery, in Munich, Germany.

== See also ==
- List of German painters
