= Karl Abt (painter) =

German painter

Karl Abt (18 December 1899, Pforzheim - 28 November 1985, Pforzheim) was a German painter.

== Life ==
Abt began to paint at the age of 12 and, with the support of his parents, enrolled in the Pforzheim Kunstgewerbeschule. In 1917, Abt was called into military service, effectively ending his studies. After the end of World War I, he was apprenticed to a goldsmith. It was not until 1928 that he again began to study painting, at the Landeskunstschule in Karlsruhe. In 1935, he returned to Pforzheim and began working as a self-employed artist. He gained recognition primarily for his naturalistic landscapes and flower paintings.

== Bibliography ==
- Karl-Ludwig Hofmann, Alfred Hübner: 63 Künstler Innen. (In und aus Pforzheim. Volume 1.) Pforzheim 1992, pp. 8–10. (In German)

== See also ==
- List of German painters
