= Otto Ackermann (painter) =

German painter

Otto Ackermann (14 February 1872 – 31 May 1953) was a 19th-century German painter, mainly of landscapes. He was born in Berlin. In 1897, he moved to Düsseldorf, where he remained until his death in 1956. He painted mainly landscape paintings of Belgium and the Netherlands, also working in printmaking on the same subjects. He was chairman of the local Düsseldorf Painters' Society and is mentioned in the diaries of Albert Herzfeld.

The few biographical facts there are include that he was trained by "Eschke in Berlin", presumably the naval and landscape painter Hermann Eschke (1823–1900). Ackerman travelled to Belgium, Italy and the Netherlands. He mostly painted landscapes and Belgian and Dutch coastal and river scenes.

Ackermann was an early member of the Deutscher Künstlerbund. In Düsseldorf he was a member of the association from 1899, and from 1898 to 1953 also of the artists' association Malkasten, from 1932 its chairman. In the course of the Gleichschaltung of the Malkasten, which took place during the National Socialist era, Ackermann became the new chairman of the association in 1934 after a change in the bylaws.

== See also ==
- List of German painters
