= Conrad Fyoll =

German painter

Conrad Fyoll, who flourished at Frankfort-on-the-Main from the year 1464 to 1476, – the only period of time of which record concerning him has been handed down to us, – is a painter whose works display graceful drawing and subdued colouring. The chief picture ascribed to him is an altar-piece in the Städel Institute at Frankfort. It represents, in the centre, Christ on the Cross, with the donor and his sons on the right wing, and his wife and daughters on the left wing. There is also a picture of the Family of St. Anne. Mention may also be made of a triptych in the Berlin Gallery formerly assigned to him, but now thought to be of rather later date, representing the Virgin and Child with St. Anna, and SS. Barbara and Catharine and the Annunciation on the wings; and of another in the Antwerp Museum, with the Adoration of the Magi in the centre, and the Nativity and Circumcision on the wings.

== See also ==
- List of German painters
