= Heinrich Anton Dähling =

German painter

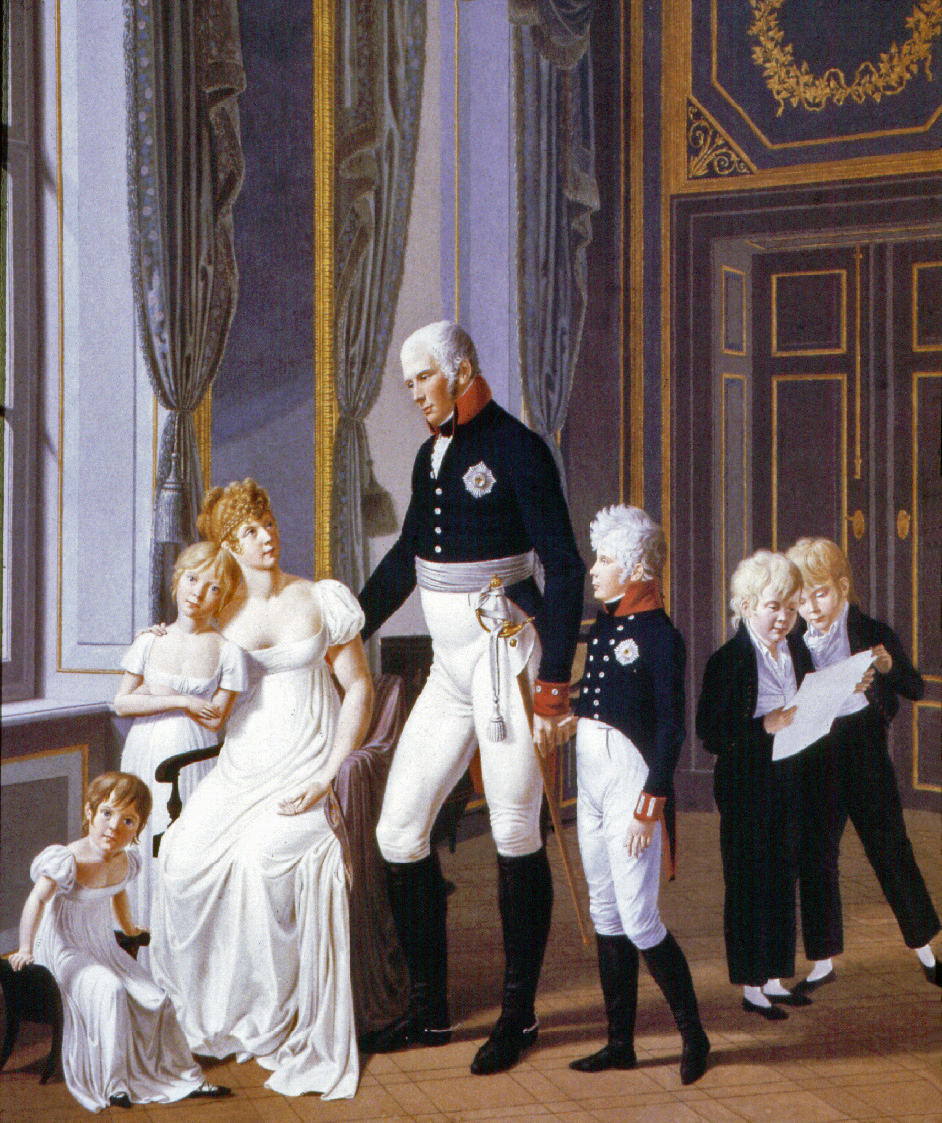
Frederick William III of Prussia and his family, 1806

Heinrich Anton Dähling (19 January 1773 – 10 September 1850) was a historical and genre painter born in Hanover. In 1794 he went to Berlin, where he was engaged in miniature painting and as a teacher of drawing. In 1802 he visited Paris, and the study of the galleries there first induced him to attempt painting in oil. From 1811 until his death he was a member of the Berlin Academy, and professor at the same from 1814 onwards. He died at Potsdam on 10 September 1850. One of his most famous pictures is The Descent from the Cross, the altar-piece at the Garrison Church in Potsdam. In the Berlin Gallery is a State Entry painted by him.

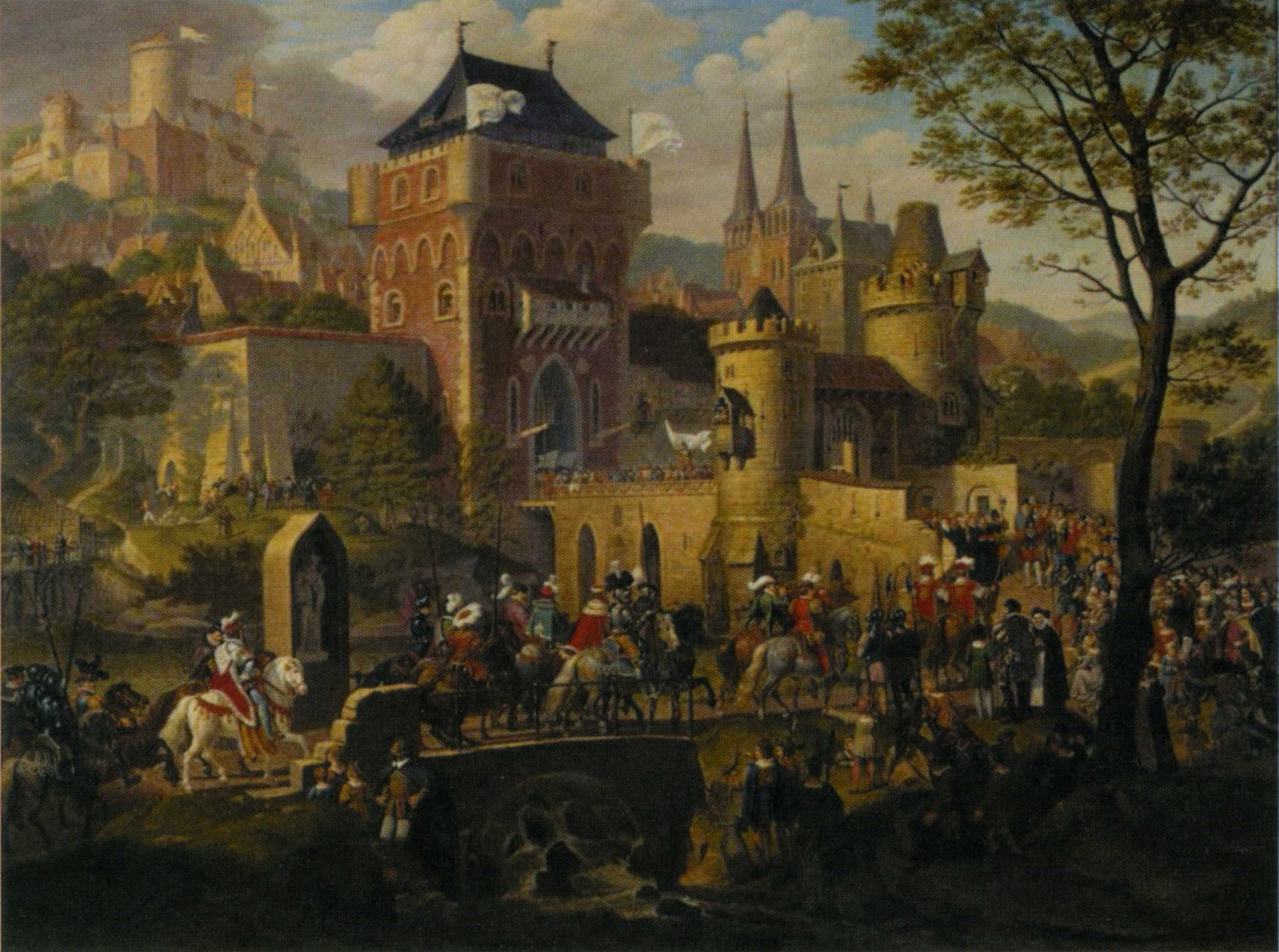
State entry in an old city, 1822, now at the Alte Nationalgalerie in Berlin

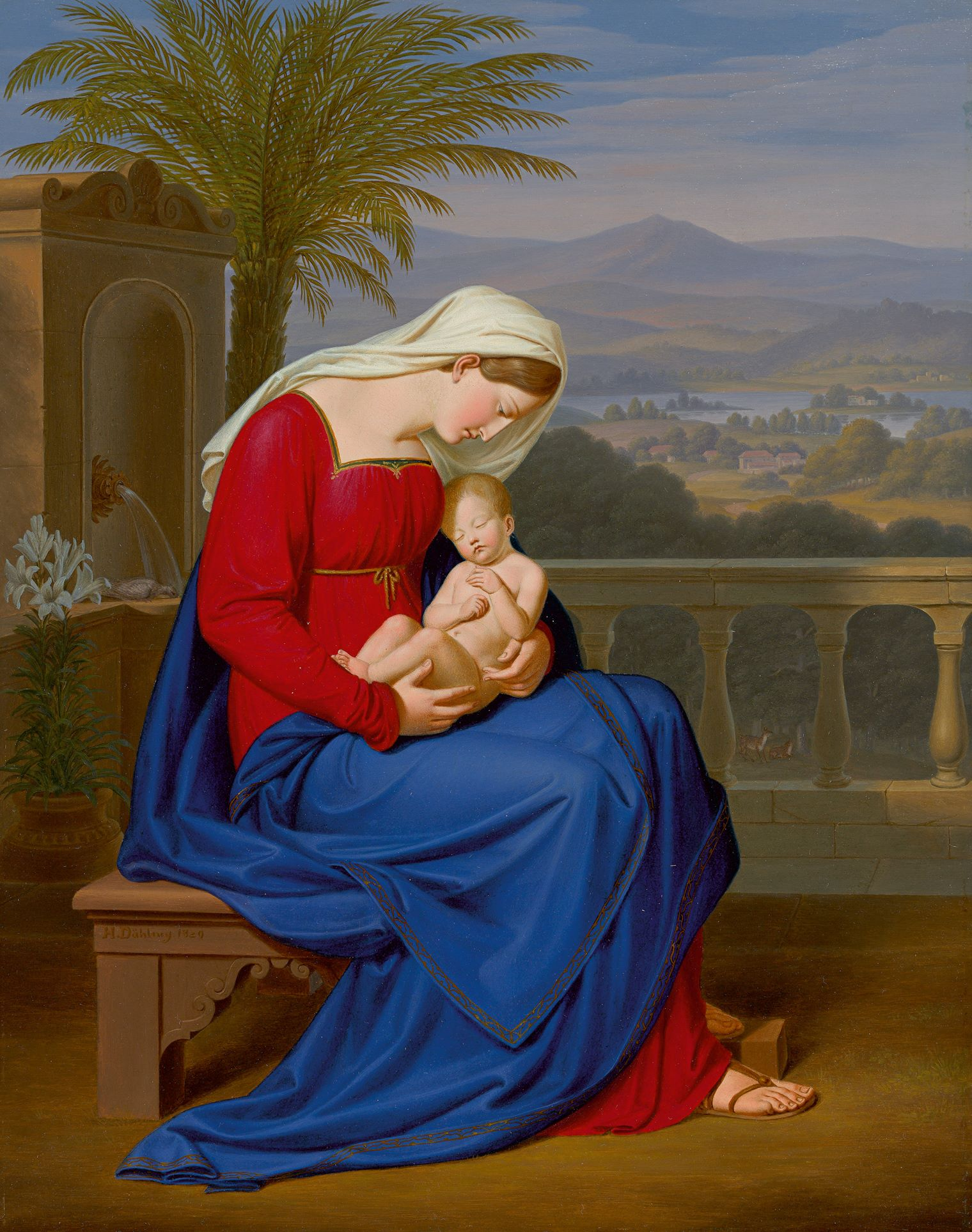
Madonna, 1820

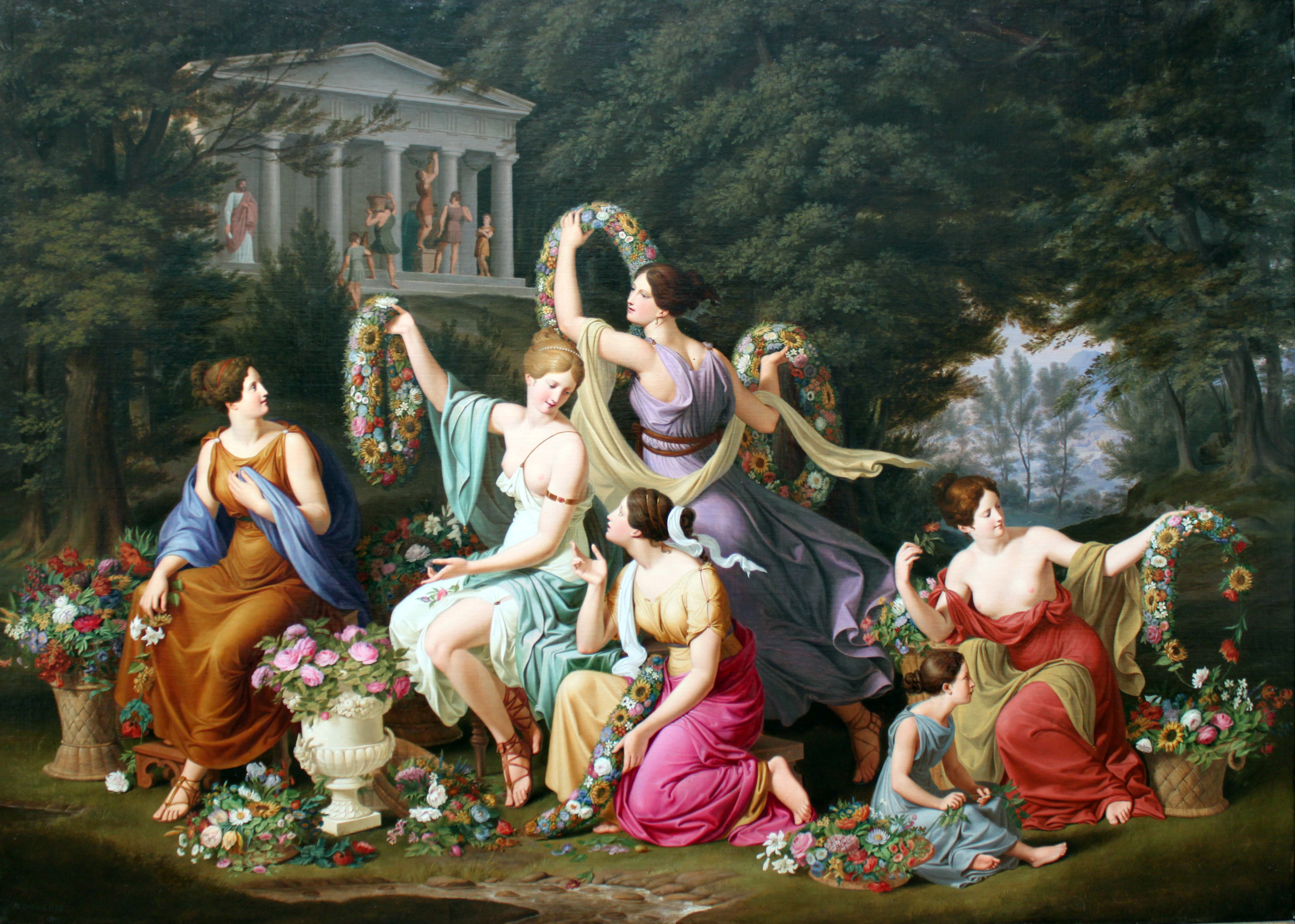
Women braiding wreaths, 1828

== See also ==
- List of German painters
