= Jakob Hecker =

German painter

Jakob Hecker (1897 - 1969) was a German landscape painter.

== Biography ==
Jakob Hecker was born in Stuttgart and worked most of his life in Munich. Before settling in Munich, he mostly painted Black Forest subjects. Later on, he focused on alpine landscapes. His initially detailed and romantic painting style, developed traits of modernism in many of Hecker's later alpine scenes. Some of his paintings have also been reproduced as artistic postcards by several art publishers, in the 1930s and 1940s. The majority of Jakob Hecker's paintings is part of private collections, with some of his works being sold in art auctions.

== See also ==
- List of German painters
