= Josef Otto Entres =

German sculptor and painter

Josef also Joseph Otto Entres (13 March 1804 – 14 May 1870) was a German sculptor and painter.

Entres was born in Fürth, and studied sculpture in Munich after July 1822, where he was a student of Konrad Eberhard. He died in Munich, where he lived at Herbststraße and at Salzstraße around 1850.

== See also ==
- List of German painters
