= Sylvester Engbrox =

German painter

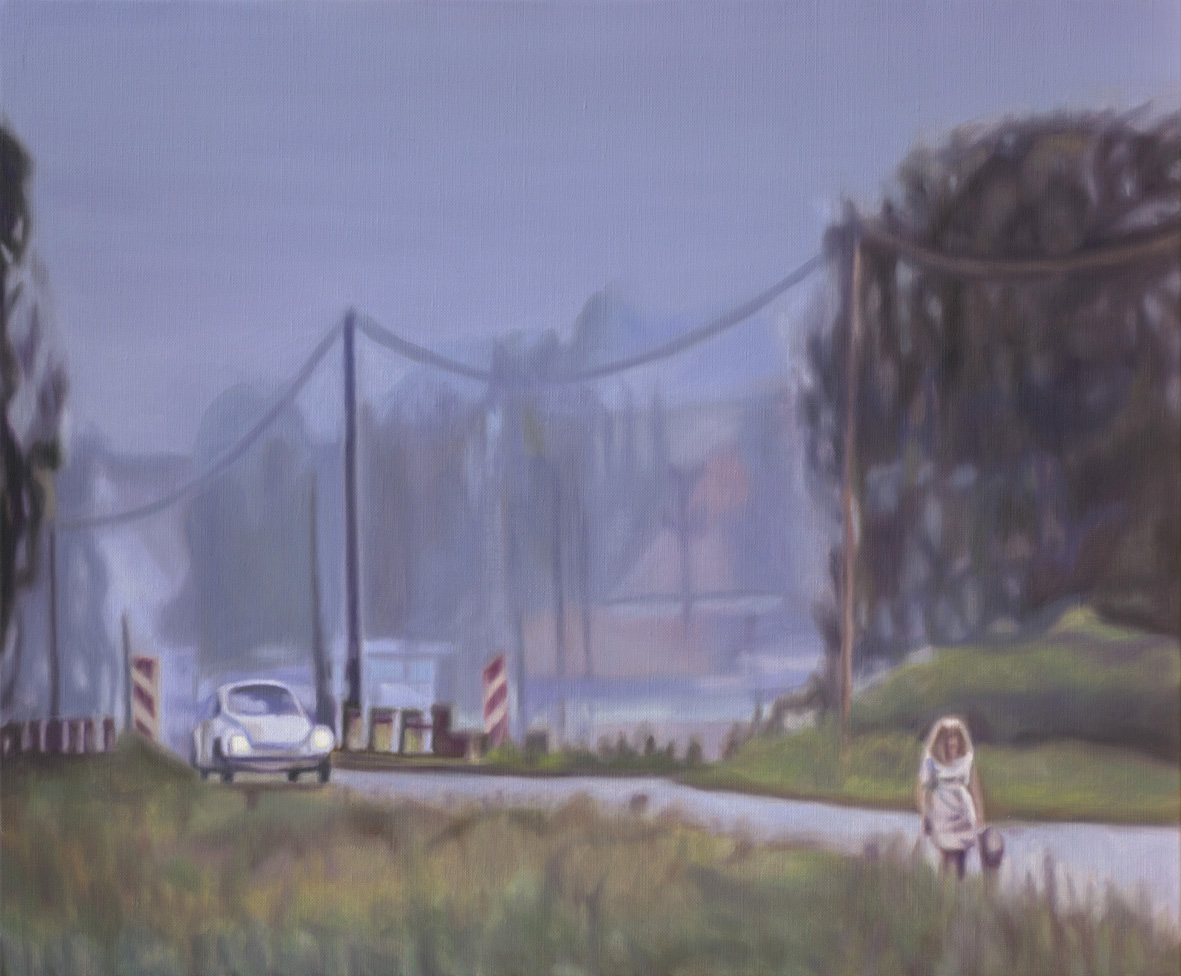
Secondary Road, Niederrhein (2009)

Sylvester Engbrox is a contemporary German painter. He was born in 1964 in Kleve, North Rhine-Westphalia. He lives and works in Paris.

== Biography ==
In 1983, Engbrox obtained a baccalauréat specialising in graphic arts. He then decided to start earning as a traditional graphic artist, assistant photographer on set and a light technician. These experiences allowed him to work with Wolfgang Flur from the group Kraftwerk, on photo shoot locations. In 1984, he began to paint. In 1986, he left Düsseldorf to live in Paris. From 1988 to 1991, he was a student at the École nationale supérieure de la photographie, in Arles (Bouches-du-Rhône). There he was a student of Arnaud Claass, Christian Milovanoff and Christian Gattinoni. He also had the opportunity to be Larry Fink's photographic assistant.

From 1999 to 2005 he created and managed with two friends in Paris an independent music label. He also contributed to the writing and the composition of titles with Sporto Kantes.

== Work ==
The first three works featured in his catalogue are from 1994: Helen, Hotel Aya and Air Disaster 1. These canvases are oil paintings based on images found in small format and poorly printed general press. The artist's work mainly introduces characters in elaborate and improbable settings.

Beginning in 2015 onwards, Sylvester Engbrox began to create photographs.

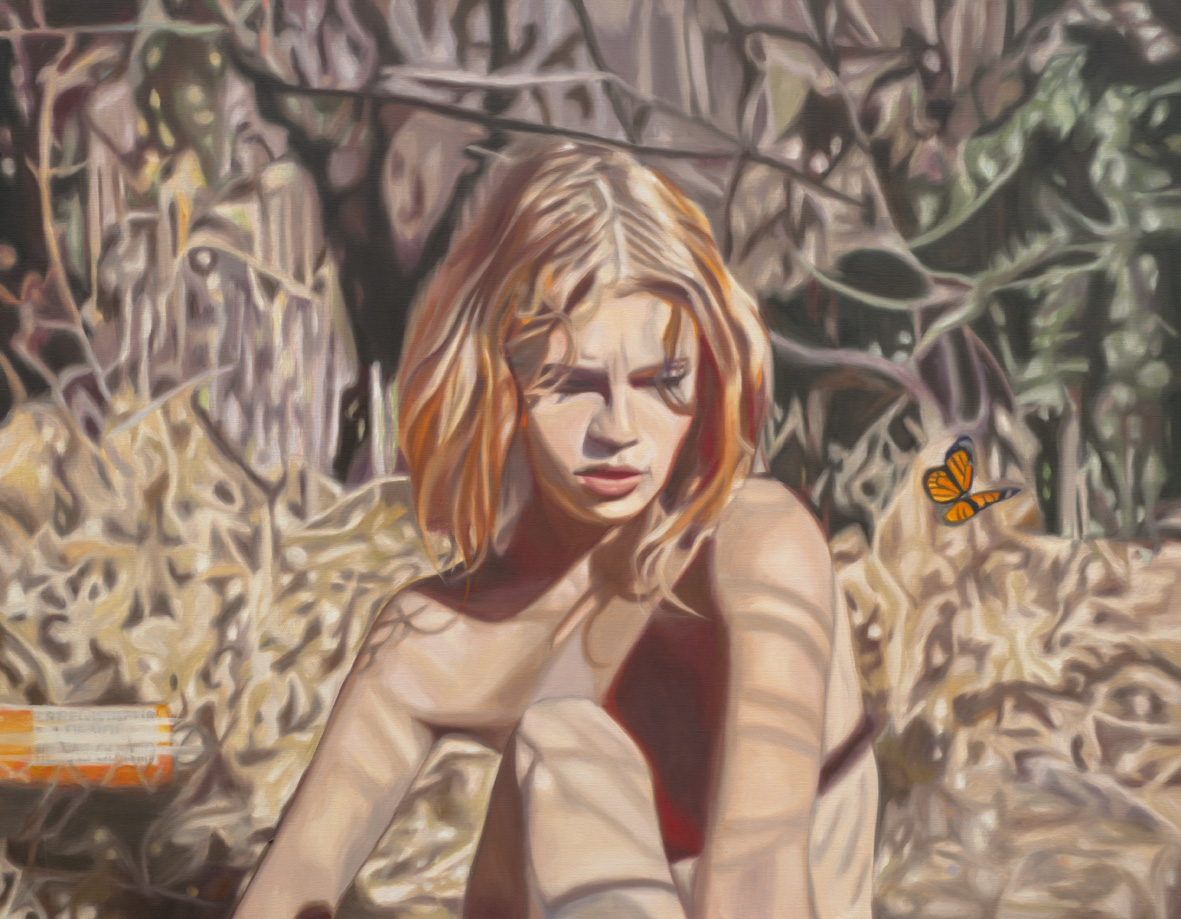
Tina, Flight Data Recorder (2009)

== Quotes ==
- 'I paint based on images found in holiday catalogues, television programmes... I have collected large quantities of images to class them according to an invented typology. This part of the work today is through the Internet and my own photographic archives. This completely useless catalogue of a depicted world clarifies nothing: the more images we see, the less we understand. But this ordering, this perpetual comparison of one portrayal with another ends by creating bridges between some of them. Sometimes these confrontations lead to a new image. It is this image, which appeared without me knowing, that I paint. My painting comes from this obsessive filing.' Sylvester Engbrox, February 2008.
- 'When a hard disk fails, a recovery programme is launched to try to save the data. My canvases try to repair a time-space that has been disrupted following a crash, to redefine it, by overlapping what remains: bits of gathered images.' Sylvester Engbrox, February 2008.
- 'His painting is totally representative of our period. Clearly figurative, linked completely to the long pictorial history, without any complex regarding official views, it opens up our imaginative fields. It proves to us, better than long speeches, the amazing vitality of painting which crosses technical evolutions (photo, video, Internet...) by digesting them greedily.' Gérard Gamand, Azart magazine, September 2008.
- 'From the heart of the proliferating mass of Web images, Sylvester Engbrox picks out those which will allow him, those to which he is sensitive, not to accomplish who knows what desire by deluding it (which is what the academic 19th-century nude painters did), but to methodically disappoint it by exposing his machinery.’ Jean-Luc Chalumeau, Sylvester Engbrox, exhibition catalogue, 2008.
- 'In this way, the artist recognises it. He is only an intermediary, a tool, a machine. It is why he explains nothing in his painting, he suggests nothing, neither eroticism, nor guilt, or suffering. He is only showing. And strictly speaking, it is really a question then of a 'show'.’ Max Torregrossa, Sylvester Engbrox, exhibition catalogue, January 2008.

== Exhibitions ==
- 2015 : Under Pressure, Paris, Espace Dupin, Group Show
- 2014 : Ausstrahlung, Paris, Galerie VivoEquidem, Solo Show
- 2013 : S. Engbrox - Paintings, Paris, Fondation Atelier de Sèvres, Solo Show
- 2012 : The Good and the Bad life, Paris, Galerie VivoEquidem, Solo Show
- 2012 : La nuit de l'instant, Marseille, Group Show
- 2011 : NordArt, Büdelsdorf, Group Show
- 2011 : ArtParis, Art Fair
- 2011 : Lille Art Fair, Lille, Art Fair
- 2011 : Follow Me, Paris, Galerie VivoEquidem, Solo Show
- 2010 : Lille Art Fair, Lille, Art Fair
- 2009 : Berliner Liste, Berlin, Art Fair
- 2009 : Glasgow Art Fair, Glasgow, Art Fair
- 2009 : Hyperceptions, Paris, Galerie VivoEquidem, Solo Show
- 2008 : Engbrox, Paris, Galerie VivoEquidem, Solo Show

== Bibliography ==
- Max Torregrossa : Approches techniques [exhibition catalogue], 2008.
- Léo Pajon: Sylvester Engbrox, Arts Magazine, March 2008, p. 43.
- Lydia Harambourg: Sylvester Engbrox, La Gazette de l’Hôtel Drouot n° 10, 14 March 2008, p. 278.
- Jean-Luc Chalumeau: Sylvester Engbrox : Un déplacement du désir de peindre, Verso n° 49, April 2008, pp. 24–25.
- Gérard Gamand: Sylvester Engbrox : Les images du siècle, Azart n° 34, September–October 2008, pp. 50–58.
- Ulrich Schönleber: Hyperceptions, ParisBerlin n° 44, September 2009, pp. 40–45.
- Naissance de la Modernité, Mélanges offerts à Jacques Vilain, Editions du Relief, Paris, 2009, ISBN 978-2-35904-000-5
- Florence Besson, Elle, n° 3386, November 2010, p. 58.
- Arts Magazine, n° 51, Dezember 2010, Dans les galeries en décembre, p. 36.
- Sylvester Engbrox, Follow Me, Patrick Williams, éditions VivoEquidem, 80 pages, Paris, 2010, ISBN 978-2-9531926-1-2
- Miroir de l'art, n° 26, May 2011, pp. 10–15, n° 33, January 2012, p. 36
- Qu'avez-vous fait de la photographie, pp. 328–331, Actes Sud, 2012, ISBN 978-2-330-00534-4
- Patrick Williams, Interview, Philosophie Magazine, n° 70, June 2013, p. 47

== See also ==
- List of German painters
