= Heinrich Ambros Eckert =

German painter

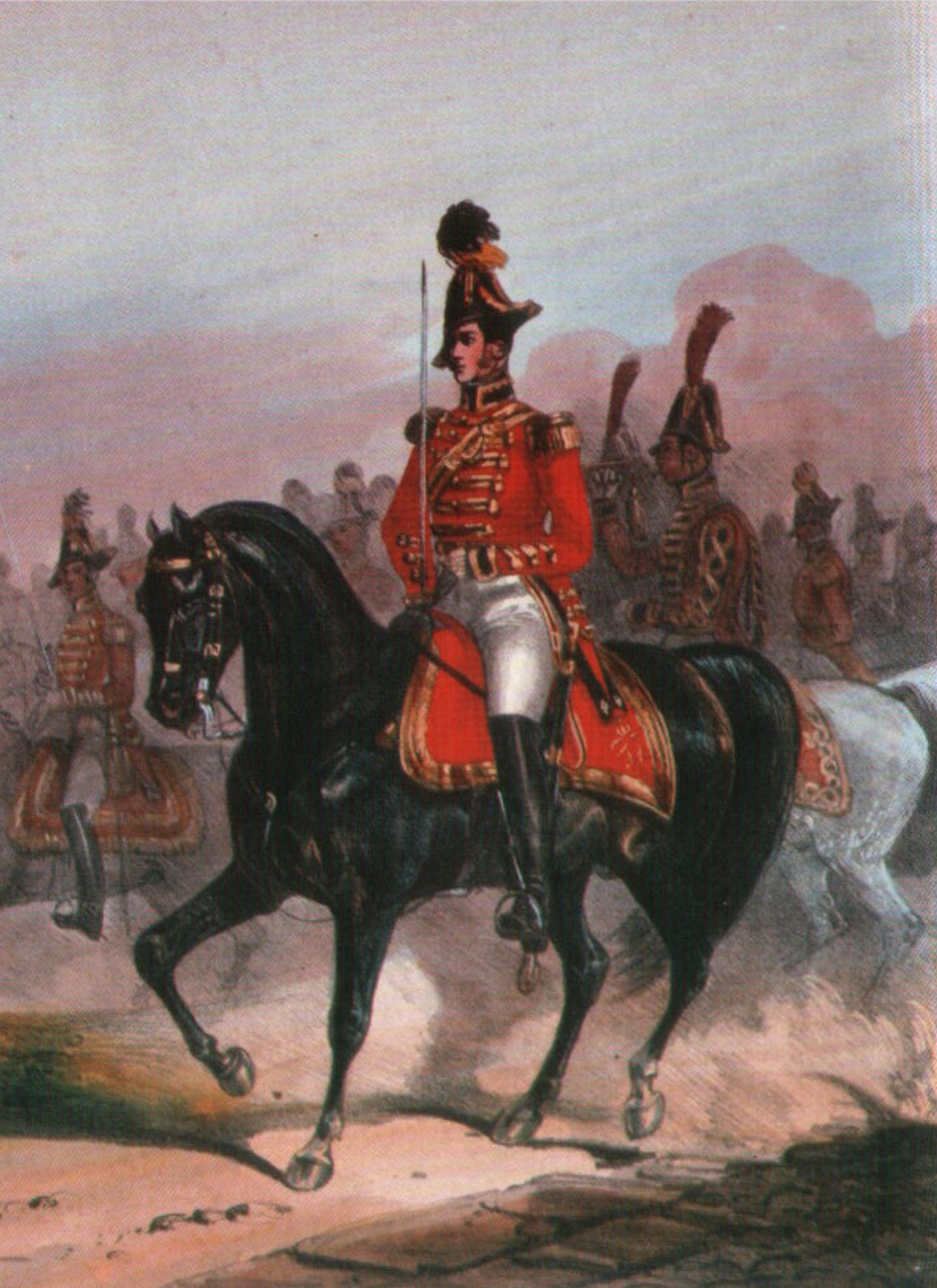
- Mounted member of the Royal Guard
- Born: 16 October 1807
- Died: 10 February 1840 (aged 32)

Heinrich Ambros Eckert (16 October 1807 – 10 February 1840) was a German painter of battle-pieces. He was born at Würzburg in the Grand Duchy of Würzburg (now Bavaria), and was at first instructed by Carl Caspar Fesel (1775-1846). In 1825 he attended the academy at Munich, and afterwards visited the Tyrol and France. Between 1835 and 1840, in conjunction with Monten and Schelver, he published a work upon the German federal army, with two hundred coloured lithographic plates; and another illustrating the return of the Russian troops to their homes. He died at Munich in 1840, while engaged upon a picture of the great review near that city before the Emperor of Russia. Besides genre subjects and battle-pieces he painted marine views.

== See also ==
- List of German painters
