= Ferdinand Fellner (painter) =

German painter, illustrator and graphic artist

Ferdinand Fellner (Frankfurt, 1799) was a German painter, illustrator and graphic artist. After receiving a high-class education he went to Munich to study art, and remained there from 1825 to 1831, but later on he established himself at Stuttgart and published a number of illustrations. As a painter his works are less meritorious. He died at Stuttgart in 1859. Some of the most remarkable of his designs for books are:

- The illustrations of The Seven Swabians.
- Sixteen illustrations of Don Quixote.
- The illustrations of Faust.
- Five illustrations of Wilhelm Tell.
- Illustrations of Wallenstein, The Maid of Orleans, Macbeth, Romeo and Juliet, Burger's Lenore, Oberon, Robert, Gudrun, &c.

Among his paintings are the following:

- Burgberg. Church. The Holy Family (partly painted by Pilgram).
- Frankfort. Emperor's Saloon. Conrad I and Frederic the Beautiful.

== See also ==
- List of German painters
