= Klaus Fisch =

German painter

Klaus Fisch (1893–1975) was a German painter. Because he painted many landscapes in the region of Eifel, he became known as "Eifelmaler" (the Eifel painter).

== Exhibitions ==
- Exhibition for the 80th Birthday at the Leopold-Hoesch Museum, Düren, 1973
- Painters of the Eifel, anniversary exhibition to mark the 100th anniversary of the Eifelverein Bad Bertrich, 1988
- Pictures of the Eifel in the guest house in Heimbach, 2007

== See also ==
- List of German painters
- German art
