= Brigitta Westphal =

German painter

Brigitta Westphal (born 1944) is a German painter.

Westphal was born in Burgoberbach/Middle Franconia, Germany. She grew up in Franconia and lived in Frankfurt for a long time. In past years she has lived partly in southern Tuscany, Italy.

Westphal's work emphasizes humans and nature, and the biographical component plays a large role. Robert Musil's novel "The Man Without Qualities" became a key source of inspiration for the painter, out of which two cycles with 14 oil pictures each developed. Since 1986, the illustration of literature has been an important part of her work. Breaks between phases of her work result from moving between Germany and Italy.
