= Chaim Kiewe =

Israeli artist

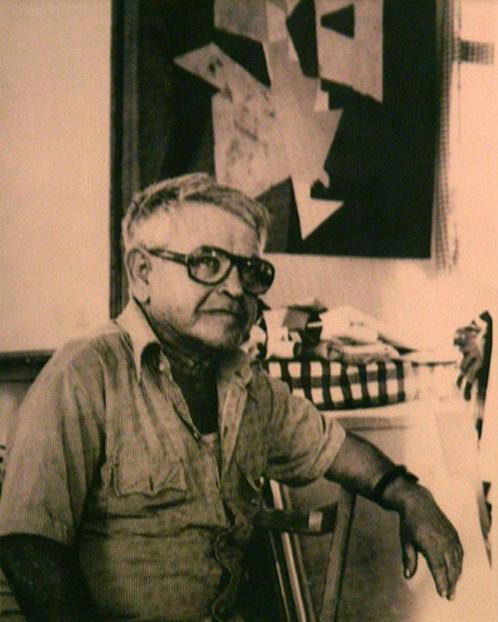
Chaim Kiewe, 1975

Chaim Kiewe (Hebrew: חיים קיוה; October 8, 1912 in Dlottowen, German Empire – May 12, 1983 in Bat Yam, Israel) was an Israeli artist.

== Biography ==
Chaim (Egon) Kiewe was born in the village Dlottowen (Eastern Prussia) in 1912. His parents Luis Kiewe and Johanna Toller, the only Jewish family in the village, owned an inn and a horse ranch. As a teenager he moved to Berlin, where he graduated high school and joined the Zionist youth movement HaHalutz. In 1934 he immigrated to Israel and joined Kibbutz Na’an.

He painted as an autodidact in his free time. His first works are portraits of Kibbutz members, and Kibbutz landscapes. In the 1940s he was a member of the "Hagana" organisation and in the year 1947 he was arrested in wake of "Operation Agatha" (Black Saturday). He was sent to Rafa Prison, where he sketched the life of the prisoners. In 1948, he was a company commander in the Givati Brigade, during the 1948 Arab–Israeli War. In the late 1940s he designed sets and costumes for plays, staged by the Na’an studio.

In 1950 he had his first one-man exhibition in the Katz Gallery in Tel Aviv, and in 1951 he made his first trip to Paris, there he worked in the "Grande Chaumiere" academy and exhibited at "La Galerie" on Rue de Seine. After a couple of months he came back to Israel and in 1953 he grounded with J. Zaritzky and A. Steimazky the painting seminar of the kibbutz movement. In the next years he ran the seminar by himself. Between 1954 and 1959 he was a member of the "Ofakim Hadashim" (New Horizons) group and participated in exhibitions of the group. Between 1959-69 he lived alternately in Paris and in Bat Yam. Part of that time, he was also the Director of the Bat Yam Municipal Museum. In those years he presented his works in one-man and group exhibitions in: Antwerp, Paris (Salon d’Art Moderne), Stuttgart (Senator Gallery), Strasbourg (Strasbourg Museum), Brussels (Museum of Modern Art), New York (the Jewish Museum), Bremen (Wiedmann Gallery), Luxembourg (Horn Gallery) and Düsseldorf (Die Brücke Gallery). In 1968-9 he took part in the "Salon des Réalités Nouvelles" and in the International Festival of Painting in Cagnes-sur-mer. Until 1970 he participated continually in the exhibitions of "Ofakim Hadashim" in Israel. In 1969 settled Kiewe in Bat Yam and became a senior lecturer at the Bezalel Academy of Art and Design in Jerusalem, in the Avni Institute of Art, and in the Bat Yam Institute of Art.

In 1974 he was honored with a retrospective exhibition in the Tel Aviv Museum, and in 1982 had a one-man exhibition in the Israel Museum in Jerusalem.

Chaim Kiewe died in 1983 in Bat Yam.

== Prizes ==
- First prize in the "Salon d’Art Moderne" in Paris (1962).
- First prize for an Israeli artist in school of Paris Exhibition in the Charpentier Gallery in Paris (1963).
- First prize for an Israeli artist in the international Festival of Painting in Cagnes-sur-mer (1969).
