= Paul Salvator Goldengreen =

German painter

Paul Salvator Goldengreen (born 27 August 1960 in Warburg, Germany) is an artist whose work originates in Art Brut / Outsider Art.

== Life ==
After fifteen months of basic military training with the German Army at Münster and Lüneburg in 1980/81, he got the Abitur after 6 semesters from 1982 to 1984 at Westfalenkolleg in Paderborn. Beginning in autumn 1985, he studied Biology in Münster and Bielefeld. In 1991 he left Bielefeld and returned home. After the death of his mother he suffered a mental illness.

== Work ==
Since April 2007 he has been featured in the permanent Internet exhibition, Gallery Of Inspiration, organised by the International Society for the Study of Trauma and Dissociation (North America). In April 2007 he contributed 20 paintings to the first Outsider Art market at the Prinzhorn Collection, Heidelberg. His work Archaic Deity is part of the Prinzhorn Collection. The painting was shown in the group exhibition "The Collection Grows".

Participation as guest in the "annual exhibition 2008 Outsider Art" in the Museum for Art Brut and Outsider Art as well as contemporary art in the Kunsthaus Kannen, Münster, from 26 October 2008 to 11 January 2009.
