= Carl Engel von der Rabenau =

German painter

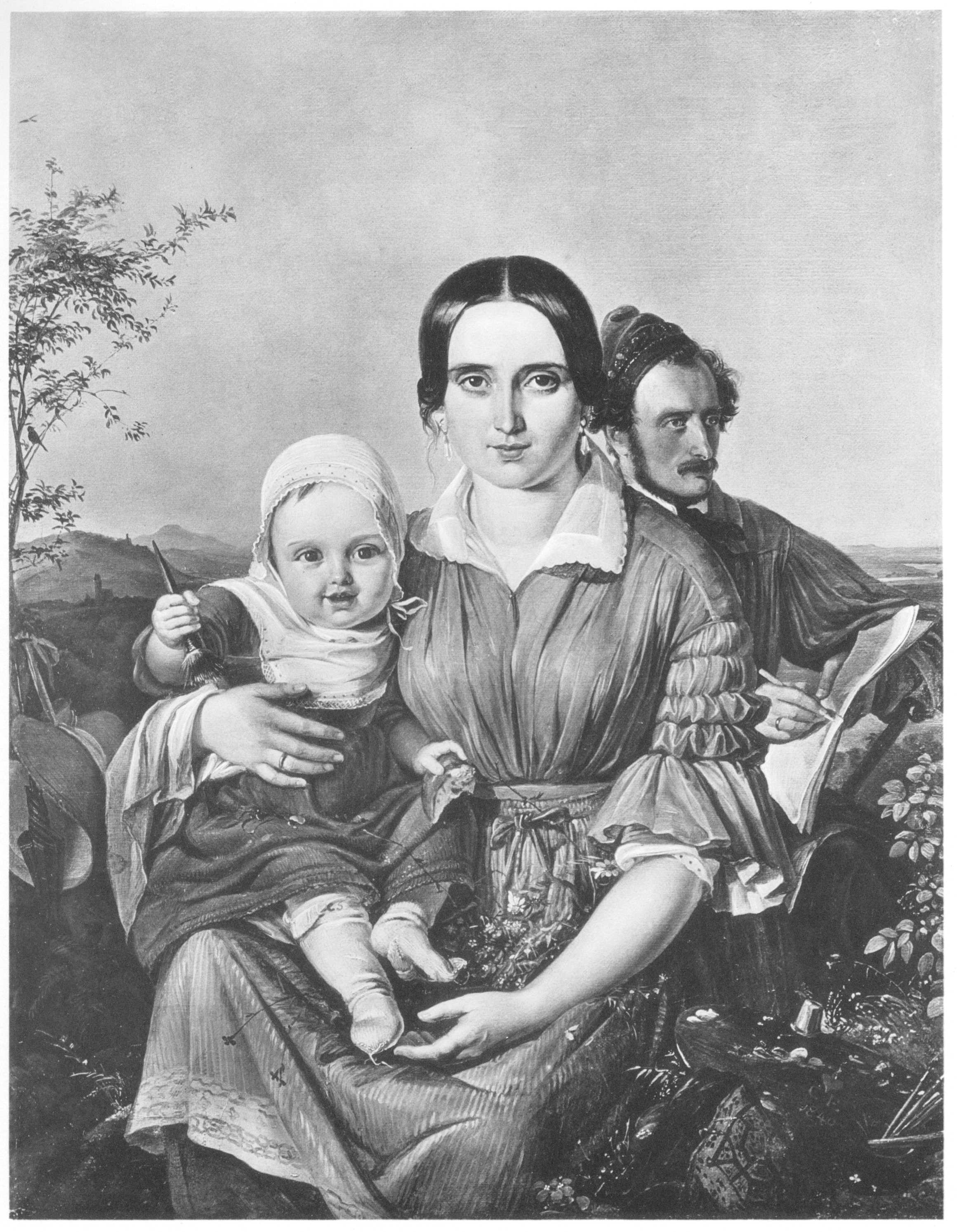
Black and white reproduction of a portrait of the family of painter Karl Ludwig Seeger

Carl Engel von der Rabenau (1817–1870), a German painter, was born at Londorf, and died at Rödelheim, today part of Frankfurt am Main.

The Darmstadt Gallery has a View of the Studio of the Sculptor Scholl, by him. Another painting Family Portrait of Councillor Debus from 1840 was added to the museum's collection, donated by the Museumsverein of Darmstadt in 2011.

== See also ==
- List of German painters
