= Wolfgang Zelmer =

German painter based in Ireland (born 1948)

Wolfgang Zelmer (born April 7, 1948, in Munich, Germany) is a German painter based in Ireland. He is best known for his modern mystical still life paintings and etchings.

== Life and work ==
Zelmer was born April 7, 1948, in Munich, Germany and studied in London at the Hampstead School of Art and Paris at the Académie Julian between 1968 and 1972. From 1975 he worked on colour etchings and lithographs in the studio of Josef Werner in Munich. Since 1980 he has maintained a second studio in Liguria, Italy. In the early 1980s, Zelmer used the portraits and anatomical drawings of artists such as Albrecht Dürer and Leonardo da Vinci or Caravaggio as references in his work. In 2000 he moved to Ireland, where he now lives and works. Since 1978 he has exhibited work in Berlin, Paris, New York City, Nice, Geneva, Sydney, Tokyo, Buenos Aires, Brussels, Nuremberg, London and Munich.

== Awards ==
- 1979 - Erding, Germany, Artaward "Erdinger Wintertage"
- 1981 - Japan, Tokio, Nikkiten Graphic Biennal, 2nd Prize
- 1982 - Monte Carlo, XVième Prix Internationale D'Art Contemporain
- 1982 - Tokyo, Gold Award des Ueno Royal Museums

== (selected) Bibliography ==
- Wolfgang Zelmer, Nature Morte, edited by Galerie & Edition Bode, authors: Dr. Franz Metzger and Dr. Helmut Orpel, Nuremberg 2002, ISBN 3-9802859-9-5
- Wolfgang Zelmer, Werkverzeichnis der Druckgrafik Band II 1995-2000, edited by Galerie & Edition Bode, authors:Franz Metzger and Eva Schickler M.A., Nuremberg 2000,ISBN 3-9802859-7-9
- Wolfgang Zelmer, Collected Time, edited by Galerie & Edition Bode, authors: Dr. Franz Metzger, Walter Schuhmacher und Hans-O. Marquass, Nuremberg 1998, ISBN 3-9802859-5-2
- Wolfgang Zelmer, Werkverzeichnis der Druckgrafik 1978-1994, edited by Galerie & Edition Bode, authors: Klaus D. Bode and Martina Höhme Nuremberg 1994,ISBN 3-9802859-4-4
