= David Lorenz =

German painter

David Lorenz (March 21, 1856 in Ogrosen, a part of Vetschau, Brandenburg, Kingdom of Prussia - April 5, 1907 in Ogrosen) was a German painter.

== Biography ==
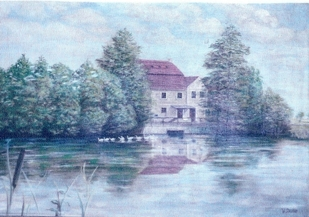
Die alte Mühle zu Ogrosen

Lorenz lived in Ogrosen for 32 years, after which he moved to Nürnberg, where he lived for eight years. Following his time there, he moved back to Ogrosen.

Some of his pictures were shown at Haus der Kunst. His most notable work is "Die alte Mühle zu Ogrosen", depicting a water mill in Spreewald.
