= Theodor Kotsch =

German painter

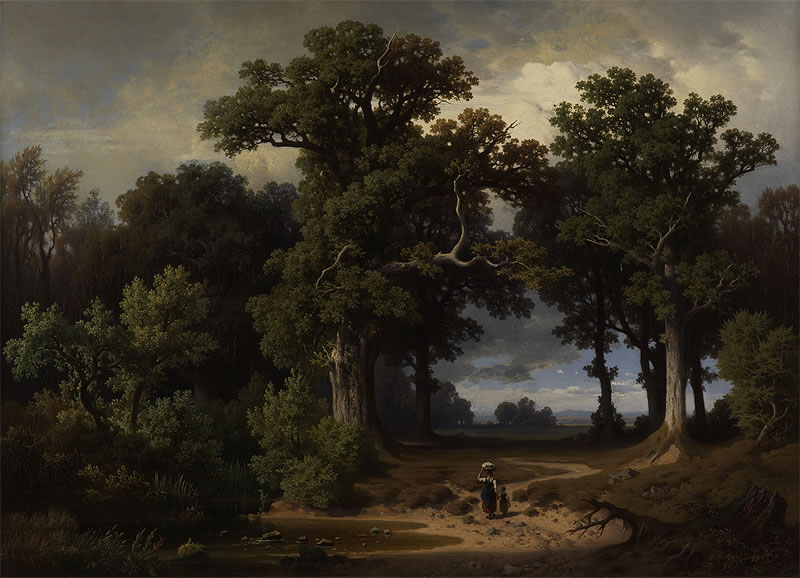
An 1855 landscape painting.

Theodor Kotsch (January 6, 1818 – November 27, 1884) was a German landscape painter.

Kotsch was born in Hanover. He went to Munich in 1839, where he developed his style by studying other masters and through landscape painting. In 1845 he returned to Hanover, and then in 1854 moved to Karlsruhe, where he joined the studio of Johann Wilhelm Schirmer. In 1870 he established himself in Munich, and died there in 1884.

His landscapes are very realistic and carefully composed, and usually taken from the Harz, Upper Bavaria, and Swabia. He also produced a number of studies of trees in chalk and pencil.

== Selected paintings ==
- Gebirgslandschaft nach Sonnenuntergang und Waldlandschaft (1847)
- Waldbach (1853)
- Eichenlandschaft bei Karlsruhe, oberbayrische Waldlandschaft (1855)
- Der Regenstein bei Blankenburg (1865)
- Waldweg bei Prien am Chiemsee (1875)
- Holzhof einer Sägemühle (1876)
- Waldweg auf der Dellingerhöhe am Ammersee (1884)
