= Karl Friedrich Fries =

German painter

Karl Friedrich Fries (1831 at Winnweiler, Germany – 1871 at St. Gall, Switzerland), studied first at the Academy at Munich, and afterwards under Berdellé. He visited Vienna, and painted there under Rahl; then went to Venice, Florence, and Calabria, where he studied the old masters. His style much resembles that of the Venetian painters.

The following are some of his works:

- Wine, Woman, and Song; in the style of Paolo Veronese. 1862.
- The Mineral Bath in the Abruzzi.
- Several copies of the Ascension of the Virgin; after Titian.
- St. Barbara; after Palma Vecchio.

== See also ==
- List of German painters
