= Oscar Pletsch =

German illustrator

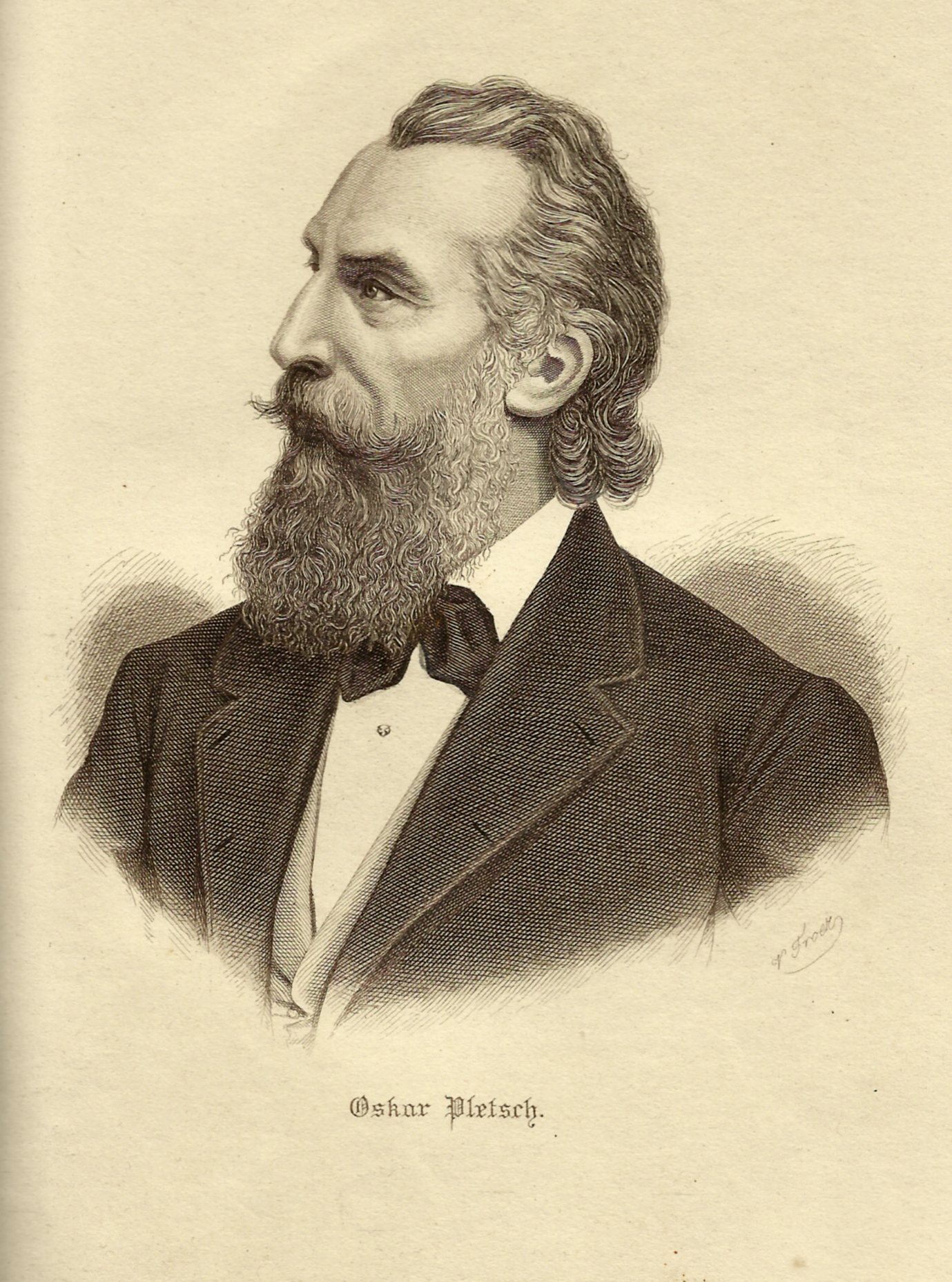
- Born: March 26, 1830; Berlin, German Confederation
- Died: January 12, 1888 (aged 57); Radebeul, German Empire
- Occupation: Illustrator
- Writing career
- Period: 19th century

Oscar Pletsch (26 March 1830 – 12 January 1888) was a German illustrator.

== Biography ==
Pletsch was born in 1830 in poor circumstances as the son of a drawing teacher and lithographer in Berlin. He studied from 1846 to 1850 in Dresden at the Art Academy under Ludwig Richter and Eduard Bendemann. Pletsch worked in Dresden until 1855, then returned to Berlin until 1871. During this time he developed his genre painting, trained by Ludwig Richter, with motifs from everyday and family life. Early on he devoted himself to illustration, mostly with depictions of children, his preferred technique became the woodcut.

In 1858, Pletsch designed a seal for the Johannisstift in Berlin. He designed it as a round seal showing St. John the Evangelist with the insignia eagle and book and bearing the transcription "God is love."

He achieved his first great success in 1860 with the book Die Kinderstube in 36 Bildern (The Nursery in 36 Pictures), and from then until 1881 a children's book by him appeared in annual succession, mostly published by Alphons Dürr in Leipzig. Pletsch thus became one of the most important and popular children's book illustrators of the 19th century, with publications also in England, France, Sweden and the USA. As part of the Edition: Bilder zur Deutschen Geschichte, published by C. C. Meinhold & Söhne, Dresden, he drew the lithograph Die Schlacht bei Fehrbellin. In 1872, at the height of his success, Pletsch moved to Niederlößnitz to his own home and studio owned by the Ziller brothers at Borstraße 57, where he lived and worked until his death in 1888 after a long serious illness. Pletsch is buried in the cemetery Radebeul-West.

Pletsch was awarded the title of professor by the King of Saxony in 1877.

== Works ==
- The Nursery in 36 Pictures, (1860)
- Little Lily's Alphabet, (1865)
- Little Folks, (1868)
- Happy Spring-Time in Pictures, (1869)
- The Child's Auction, and other stories, (1869)
- The Holiday, and other stories, (1870)
- Chimes and Rhymes for Youthful Times!, (1871)
- Child-Land: picture-pages for the little ones, (1874)
- Buds and Flowers of Childish Life, (1875)
- Schnick Schnack: trifles for the little ones, (1876)
