= Henriette Manigk =

German painter

Henriette Manigk (also called Jette) (born 30 April 1968 at Usedom) is a German painter.

== Life ==
Manigk is the daughter of the painter Oskar Manigk and granddaughter of the painter Otto Manigk. She completed her graduation in 1986 in Wolgast. From 1986 to 1987, she worked in the painting studio of the theater of Greifswald. In 1990, she made a study trip to Kenya with a stop at Nani Groze-Grieshaber. From 1996 to 1997, she worked in Blue Meier's studio in Bremen.

From 1994 to 1998, she studied art, art therapy and art education at the State University Ottersberg, she received her diploma in 1998.

She lives and works in Bremen since 1998. Manigk has a son.

== Solo exhibitions / awards (selection) ==
- 2001: gallery Paula Panke, Berlin
- 2002: gallery Schwartzsche Villa, Berlin
- 2003: gallery in Kulturhaus Spandau / gallery Arcus, Berlin
- 2004: gallery W, Bremen
- 2005: gallery Veritti Art, Berlin
- 2006: zapp-live-gallery, Berlin
- 2009: Art Award Elbfeuer, Hamburg

== Group exhibitions (selection) ==
- 1998: gallery Kubo, Bremen
- 2000: museum in Syke
- 2003: gallery Kunstpavillon, Usedom
- 2004: gallery Wollhalle, with Oskar Manigk, Güstrow
- 2004: gallery am Wasserturm, Berlin
- 2005: gallery Kunstpavillon, Usedom
- 2006: gallery Kunstpavillon, Usedom
- 2007: gallery East End, Delmenhorst
