= Max Lohde =

German painter

Max Lohde (February 13, 1845 – December 18, 1868) was a German painter, known for his sgraffito work.

Born in Berlin to Ludwig Lohde, an architect, Lohde studied under Julius Schnorr in Dresden and Peter von Cornelius in Berlin, then at the Prussian Academy of Arts, where he won a prize in 1866. While a student, he took a trip to Silesia that aroused his interest in some recently discovered remnants of old sgraffito art, and developed skill in the technique, as well as discovering a new process for producing it. In 1867 he executed four large sgraffito compositions from the Epic Cycle in the stairway of the Sophiengymnasium in Berlin. He also produced a sgraffito work for the pediment of the German War Ministry's riding school, as well as other decorative painting.

In 1868, during a trip to Italy to study old sgraffito work, he died in Naples. His correspondence with Cornelius and travel reports on the trip were published in some 1868 and 1869 issues of the German art history magazine Zeitschrift für bildende Kunst.
