= Wilhelm Lichtenheld =

German painter

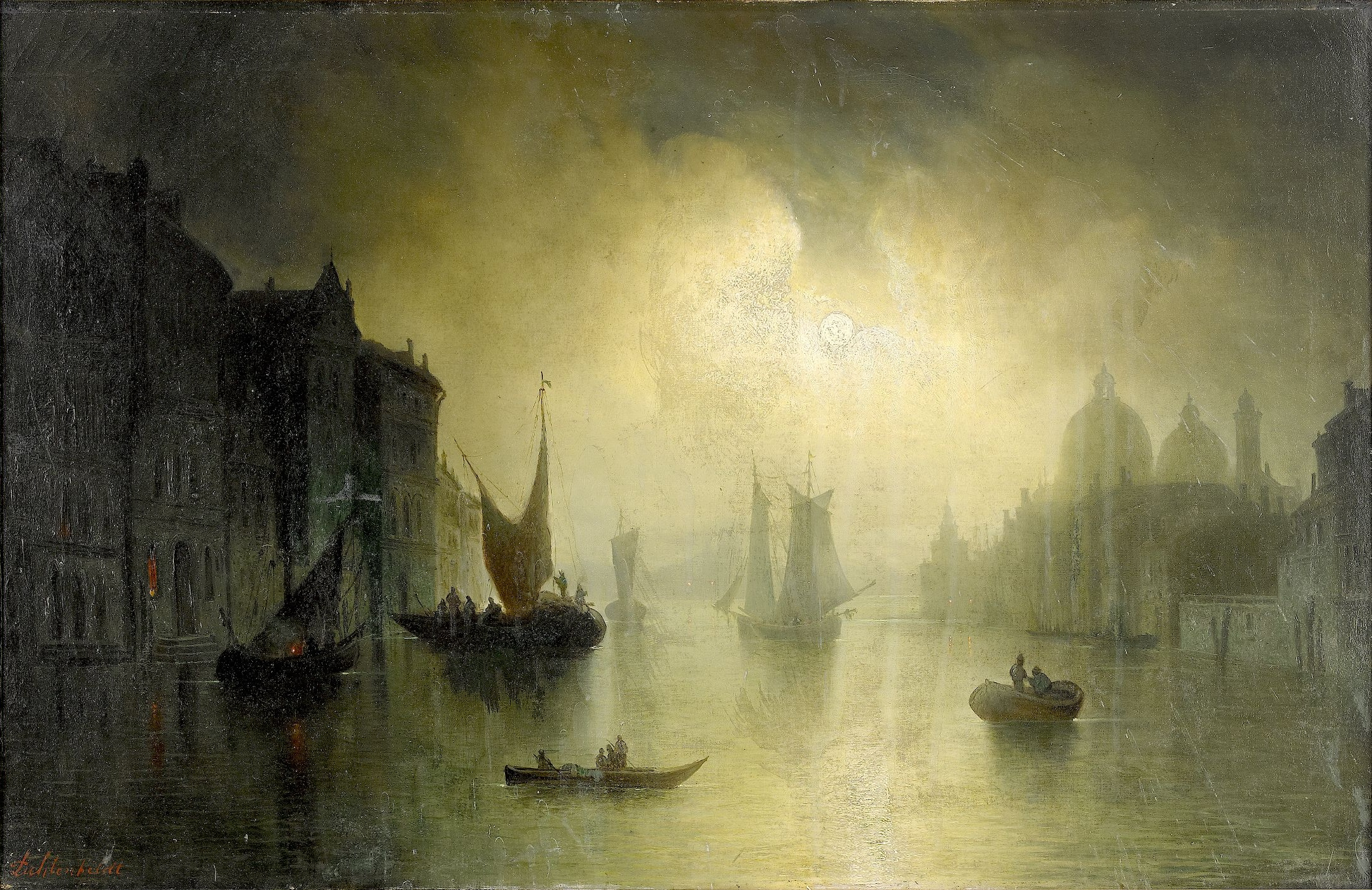
The Grand Canal in Moonlight

Wilhelm Lichtenheld (13 October 1817, Hamburg - 25 March 1891, Munich) was a German landscape and architectural painter; known for atmospheric evening and nighttime scenes.

== Biography ==
He was the son of an actor at the Hamburg Stadt-Theater. Inspired by his father's theatrical work, he originally planned to be a stage painter and took drawing lessons from an older brother.

In 1839, he studied at the Academy of Fine Arts, Munich. He was able to study there for only one year, so he completed his artistic education by copying the Old Masters at the Alte Pinakothek. He also began creating his own original works; genre scenes at first, then romantic landscapes with staffage, often painted by moonlight.

He became a member of the Kunstverein München in 1840, and began participating in their exhibitions. Later, he took a study trip to Italy and visited Venice.

His activities and interests were wide-ranging, including botany, fishing, hunting and gymnastics. He was also an avid collector. On numerous occasions, he performed as an actor, in local festivities. His seventieth birthday was a public celebration.

== Sources ==
- Hyacinth Holland (1906). "Lichtenheld, Wilhelm". Allgemeine Deutsche Biographie (in German). Vol. 51. Leipzig: Duncker & Humblot. pp. 691–694.
