= Paul Schneider (painter) =

German painter

E. Paul Schneider (born 6 March 1884 in Plauen/Vogtl., Germany) was a successful German painter and draughtsman. He was the last court painter of the German Emperor, King of Prussia Wilhelm II and Empress Hermine.
