= Nicholas Wurmser =

German painter

- Nikolaus Wurmser, Nicolaus Wurmser
- Born: c. 1298; Strasbourg
- Died: c. 1367; Prague
- Known for: paintings
- Style: Gothic

Nicholas Wurmser (c. 1298 – c. 1367), (German: Nikolaus or Nicolaus Wurmser, Czech: Mikuláš Wurmser), was a 14th-century Gothic painter from Strasbourg, Alsace. He was active in Prague, Bohemia, where he worked as a court painter of Emperor Charles IV.
