= Master of the Arboga altarpiece =

The Master of the Arboga altarpiece was an artist working in Lübeck between 1490 and 1525.

In 1672, the Swedish painter Christian von Thum is recorded as having worked on an altarpiece for the Church of Arboga.
