= Anke Besser-Güth =

German artist (1940-2019)

- Born: December 16, 1940; Erfurt, Germany
- Died: February 23, 2019 (aged 78); Waren, Germany
- Known for: Sculpture

Anke Besser-Güth (December 16, 1940 - February 23, 2019) was a German artist best known for her sculpture.

Besser-Güth was born on December 16, 1940 in Erfurt, Germany. Her career stated with her apprenticeship as a stonemason. She went on to study at the Dresden Academy of Fine Arts (Hochschule für Bildende Künste Dresden). Most of Besser-Güth's public sculpture was completed on commission when Erfurt was part of East Germany. After reunification Besser-Güth worked primarily in ceramics and pastels.

She was married to fellow artist Siegfried Besser (born 1941).

Besser-Güth died in Waren, Germany on February 23, 2019.

== Selected public sculptures ==
- Rosa Luxemburg, Erfurt, Germany
- Käthe Kollwitz, Nordhausen, Germany
- Eisenach Party Congress, Eisenach, Germany

=== Gallery ===
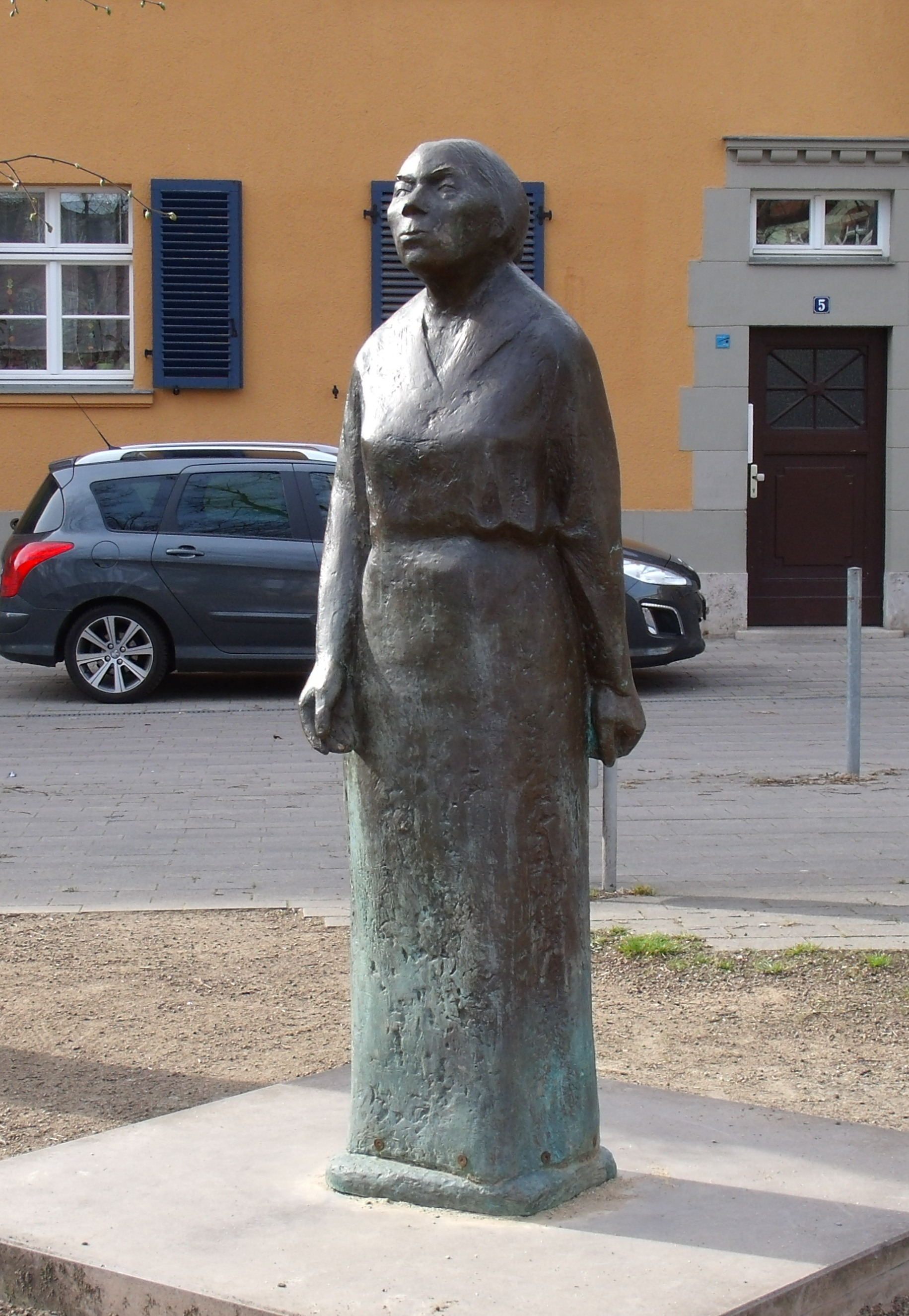
Käthe Kollwitz

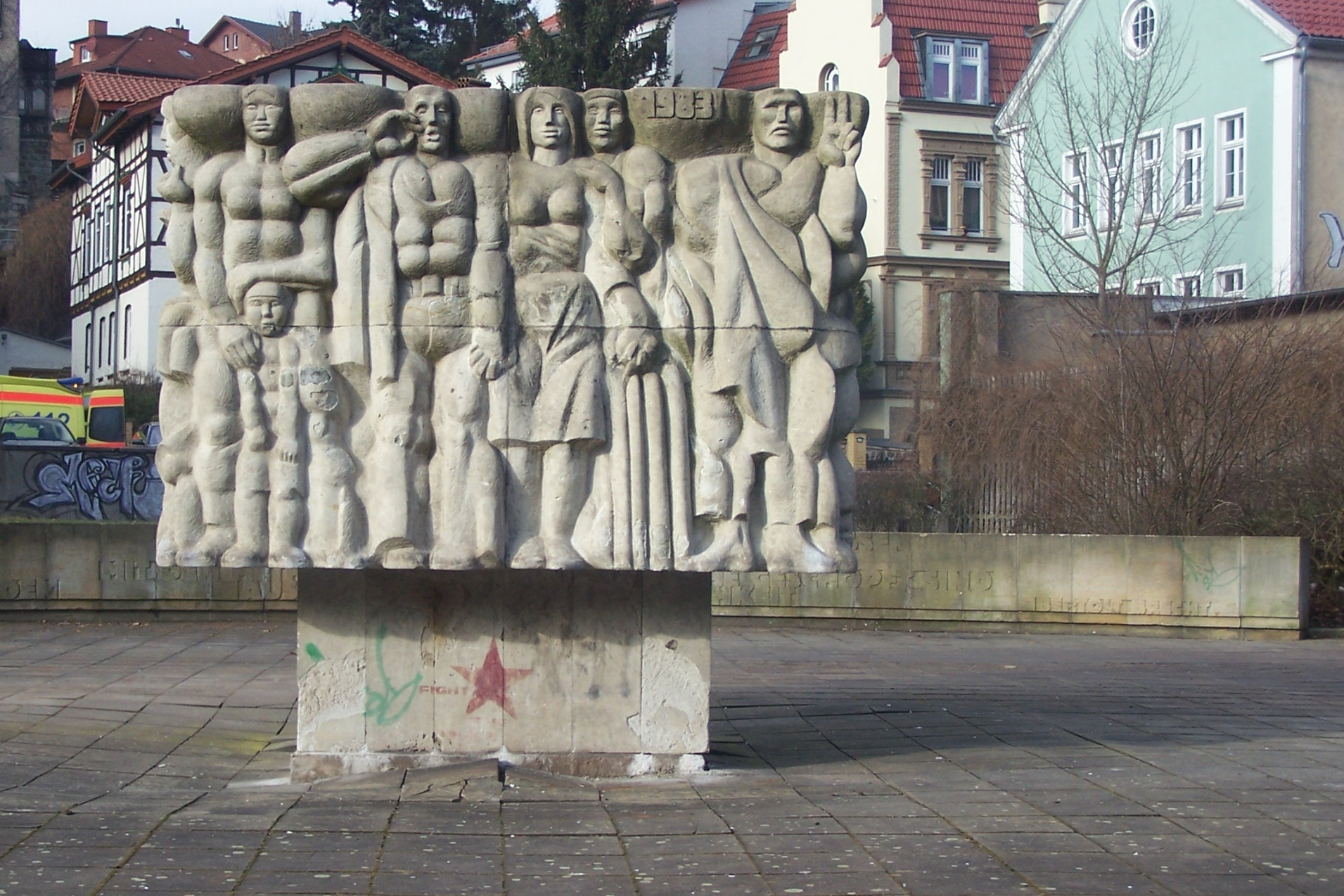
Denkmal der Arbeiterklasse

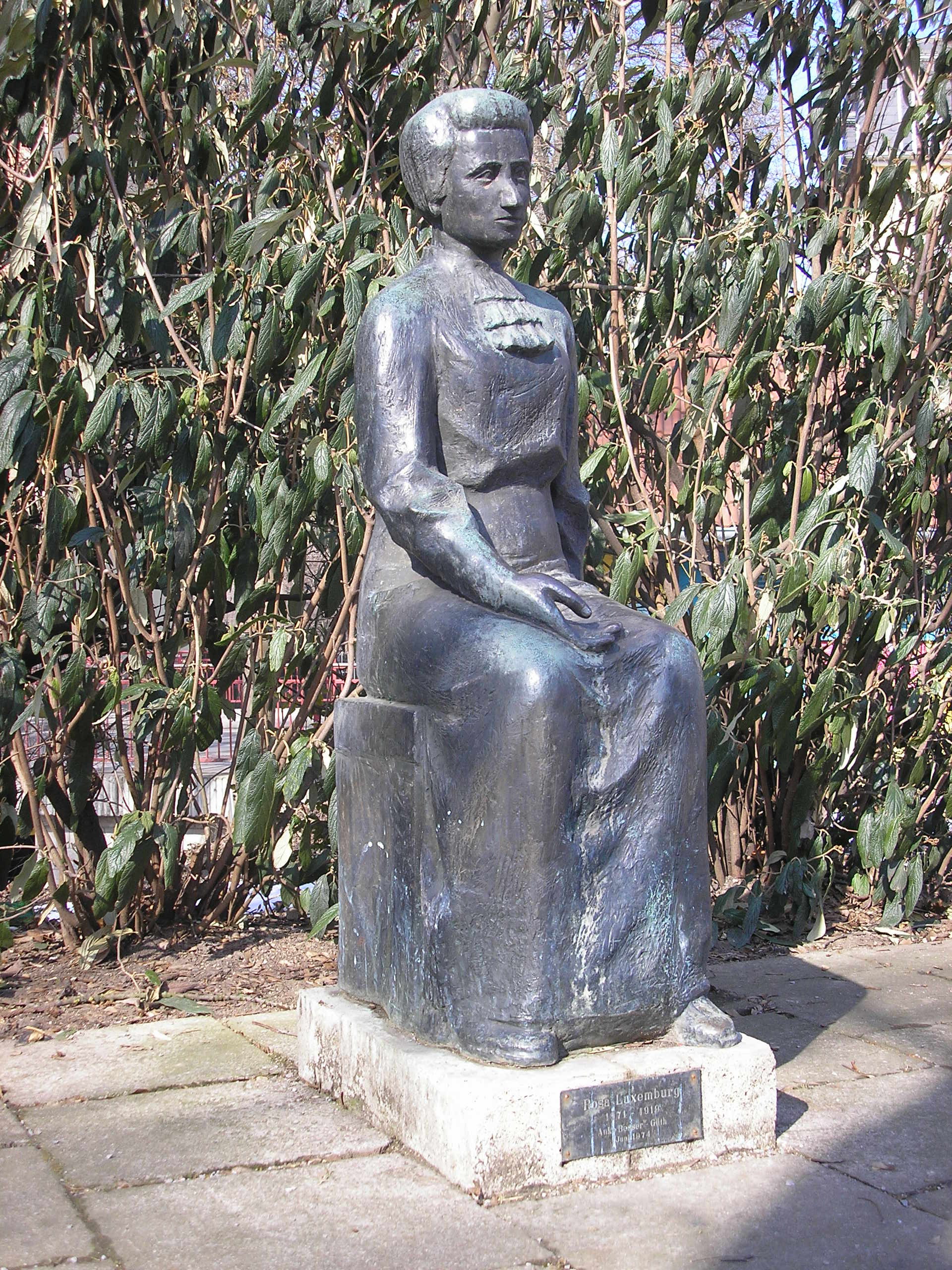
Rosa Luxemburg
