= Alexander von Gleichen-Rußwurm =

German author (1865–1947)

Alexander von Gleichen-Rußwurm (6 November 1865, Greifenstein Castle, Bad Kissingen - 25 October 1947, Baden-Baden) was a German writer, editor, translator and philosopher. His name in full was Heinrich Adalbert Carl Alexander Konrad Schiller, Freiherr von Gleichen, genannt von Rußwurm

== Biography ==
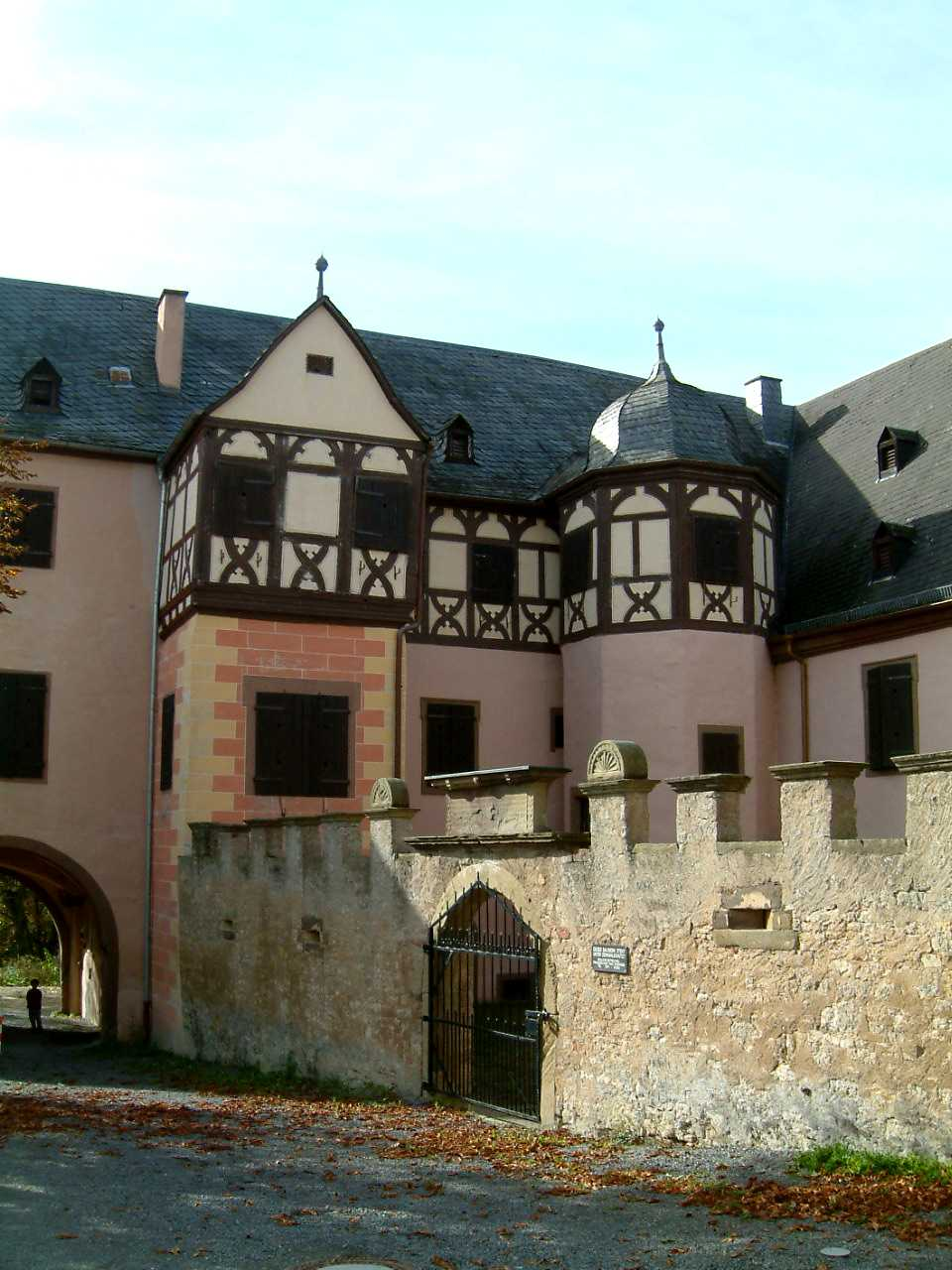
Greifenstein Castle

He was born at Greifenstein Castle, an hereditary property of the Rußwurm family since 1657. His father, the painter Ludwig von Gleichen-Rußwurm, was a grandson of the poet, Friedrich Schiller. His mother, Elisabeth (Baroness von Thienen-Adlerflycht), died a few weeks after he was born, so he was raised by his grandmother Emilie, Schiller's youngest daughter. Due to his family's reverence for his famous ancestor, a writing career was virtually inevitable.

However, following the tradition for noble families, he received his primary education at military schools. From 1883 to 1895, he served as an adjutant, with the rank of lieutenant, for Grand Dukes Louis IV and Ernest Louis. In 1895, he married Baroness Sophie von Thienen-Adlerflycht, one of his mother's nieces. They lived at Greifenstein, where the guest book shows an impressive list of literary visitors, including Heinrich Mann, Friedrich Lienhard and Johannes Fastenrath.

Shortly after World War I, he acquired the "Hotel Krone" in Wasserburg am Bodensee and entered the tourism industry. Although moderately successful, it failed to solve his growing financial problems. His efforts to emulate his great-grandfather, Schiller, had apparently made him mentally as well as financially unstable, leading to an incident that left him with the nickname "Mouse Baron".

=== The "Mouse Affair" ===
He said that he was sending a two-meter (6.6 ft.) chain, made from 234 cultured pearls, to a jeweler in Munich to be reworked. The package was insured and had an estimated value of 65,000 ℛ︁ℳ︁. However, when the package arrived, it contained a dead mouse, not the chain. He reported the incident himself. The investigations took four years, until 1929, when charges of fraud were brought against him in Würzburg. He was accused of deliberately placing a live mouse in the package which, rather than die, was expected to gnaw its way out and simulate a damaged shipment, thereby enabling him to collect on his insurance. He vehemently denied the allegations, while he prepared an insanity defense; citing hallucinations and a "split personality".

He finally claimed that he had placed the chain and mouse in identical cigarette boxes, then became confused and threw the chain into a stream, instead of the dead mouse, as intended. Friends tried to support him, but were concerned about suicidal thoughts he had expressed. Expert testimony from several psychologists was contradictory. The court found him guilty but, in consideration of his age, mental condition and lack of any previous record, limited his punishment to a fine of 10,000 ℛ︁ℳ︁.

In 1933, he was one of eighty-eight writers who signed the "Gelöbnis treuester Gefolgschaft"; a pledge of loyalty to Adolf Hitler. After the reintroduction of general conscription and the beginning of rearmament in 1935, the military authorities decided to enlarge their proving grounds in Hammelburg and relocate two nearby villages. As the expansion progressed, he and Sophie were forced to prove their loyalty and leave Greifenstein in 1938. His collection of literary memorabilia was donated to the Schiller-Nationalmuseum. The couple settled in Baden-Baden, in a villa overlooking the Lichtentaler Allee. Once again, his home became a gathering place for famous writers, including Gerhart Hauptmann, Otto Flake and Börries Freiherr von Münchhausen.

He died there, largely forgotten and impoverished, just before his eighty-second birthday. He was the last known descendant of Schiller. Thomas Mann mentions him three times by name in his novel, Doctor Faustus (1947).

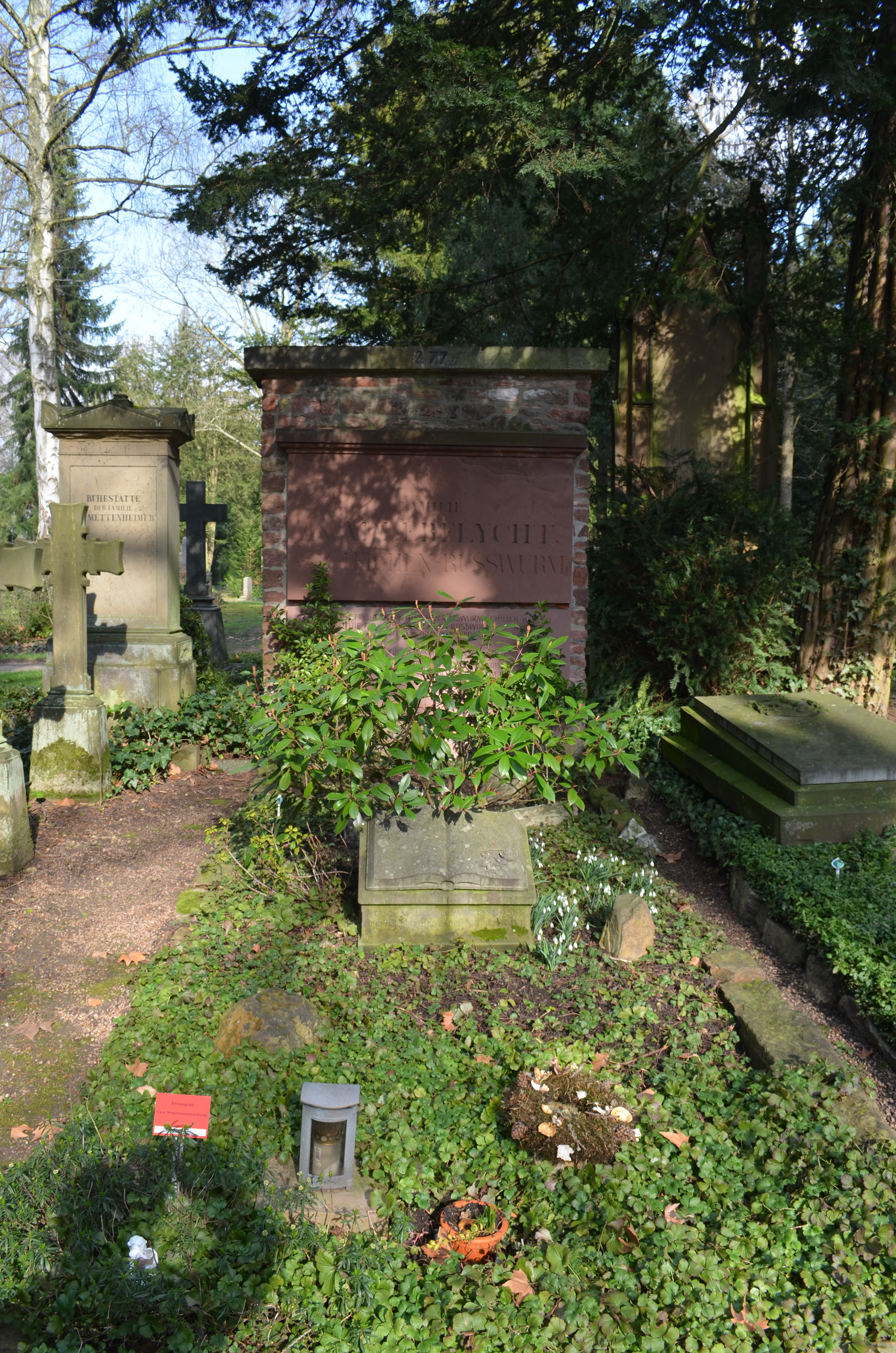
The Adlerfycht-Rußwurm family grave, Frankfurt Main Cemetery

== Sources ==
- Leonhard Lenk (1964). "Gleichen genannt von Rußwurm, Heinrich Adelbert Konrad Carl Alexander Schiller Freiherr von". Neue Deutsche Biographie (in German). Vol. 6. Berlin: Duncker & Humblot. pp. 445–446. (full text online).
- Christian Fuchs: Der Urenkel Schillers. Ein fränkischer Essayist: Alexander von Gleichen-Rußwurm, Manuscript for a broadcast by the Bayerischen Rundfunks, Studio Nürnberg, 31 May 1984
- Karin Rother: Alexander von Gleichen-Rußwurm. Entry in Walther Killy (Ed.): Literaturlexikon. Autoren und Werke deutscher Sprache, Directmedia Publishing, Berlin 1998, ISBN 3-932544-13-7
- Fridolin Altweck: Carl Alexander von Gleichen-Rußwurm, Erfolgsautor – Vorzeigearistokrat – Mäusebaron. Biography in the Jahrbuch des Landkreises Lindau 2006. Verlag Eppe, ISBN 3-89089-085-7 pp. 116–129.
