= Flake =

Flake or Flakes may refer to:

== People ==
- Christian "Flake" Lorenz, German musician and member of the band Rammstein
- Gisa Flake (born 1985), German actress and singer
- Jake Flake, American politician
- Jeff Flake (born 1962), American politician
- Floyd H. Flake (born 1945), A.M.E. minister, university administrator, former U.S. representative
- Magdalene Schauss-Flake (1921–2008), German composer and organist
- Minna Flake (1886–1958), German physician
- Otto Flake (1880–1963), German writer

== Arts, entertainment, and media ==
=== Music ===
==== Groups ====
- Flake (band), an Australian psyche/prog rock band from Sydney, active in the late 1960s and early 1970s
- Flake, the original name of the band Flake Music, the predecessor of The Shins

==== Songs ====
- "Flake" (song), a song from the 2001 album Brushfire Fairytales by Jack Johnson
- "Flake", an early song by System of a Down, see System of a Down discography
- "Flakes", a song from the 1979 album Sheik Yerbouti by Frank Zappa
- "Flakes", a song from the 2008 album Twenty One by the Mystery Jets

=== Other arts, entertainment, and media ===
- Flakes (film), a 2007 film with Aaron Stanford and Zooey Deschanel
- Flakes (manga), a manga anthology by Naoki Yamamoto

== Food and food preparation ==
- Flake (chocolate bar), a brand of chocolate bar manufactured by Cadbury
- Flake (fish), an Australian term for edible flesh of one of several species of shark
- Flake, an individual popped kernel of corn
- Fish flake, a platform for drying cod

== Science and technology ==
- Flake (software), a software library for KDE
- Flake tobacco, used in a smoking pipe
- Lithic flake, a fragment of stone found in archaeology
- Nano flake, a novel shape of semiconductor nanostructure
- Snowflake, a particle of snow
- Snowflake Computing, a cloud data warehouse company
- Snowflake schema, a logical arrangement of tables in a multidimensional database

== See also ==
- Fleck (disambiguation)
