= Ernst Stadler =

German poet

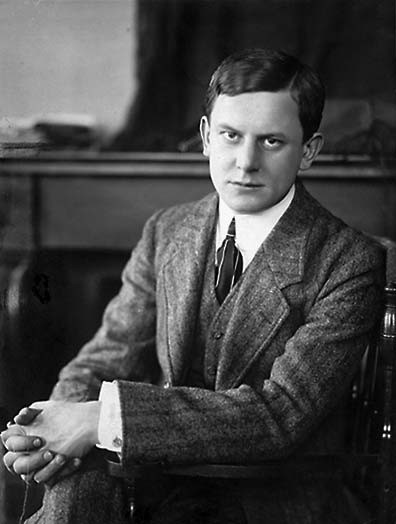
- Stadler in Belgium in 1914
- Born: Ernst Maria Richard Stadler; 11 August 1883; Colmar, Alsace–Lorraine, German Empire
- Died: 30 October 1914 (aged 31); Zandvoorde, Belgium
- Writing career
- Genre: Poetry
- Military career
- Branch: Imperial German Army
- Service years: 1914
- Rank: Lieutenant
- Unit: XV Corps
- Conflicts: First World War

Ernst Maria Richard Stadler (11 August 1883 – 30 October 1914) was a German Expressionist poet, writer and translator. As a poet, he was part of the early German expressionist movement.

Born in Colmar, Alsace-Lorraine, and educated in Strasbourg and Oxford, he was awarded a Rhodes Scholarship to study at Magdalen College, Oxford in 1906. His early verse was influenced by Stefan George and Charles Péguy, but after 1911, Stadler began developing a different style. His most important volume of poetry, Der Aufbruch, which appeared during 1914, is regarded as a major work of early Expressionism. The poems of Der Aufbruch are a celebration of the poet's joy in life and are written in long, free verse lines inspired by the example of Walt Whitman. Stadler was killed in battle at Zandvoorde near Ypres in the early months of World War I.

== Early life and education ==
=== Family ===
Ernst Stadler was born on 11 August 1883 in Colmar, Alsace-Lorraine as the second son of Xavier Stadler and Regine Catherine Stadler (née Abrell). Alsace-Lorraine had been incorporated into the German Empire twelve years prior. His father Xavier was a Catholic from a poor family in Sonthofen. He later became a lawyer and worked in the Prussian Ministry of Justice from 1896 to 1906, and then later worked as the Deputy Curator of the Kaiser-Wilhelms-Universität in Strasbourg. In contrast, his mother Regine was a Protestant from a commercial family in Kempten. His older brother, Hans Stadler, was born on 30 April 1880, and became Lord Mayor of Kassel from 1925 to 1933, when he was forced to resign by the Nazis. Hans died in Berlin in February 1943. During the 22-23 October 1943 bombing of Kassel, Han's house - which also contained his younger brother's papers - were destroyed.

=== Education ===
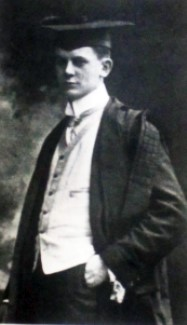
Stadler as an Oxford Undergraduate around 1906

Stadler was baptised in the Protestant rite, but was given the Catholic Maria as a middle name. From 1892 to 1902, he studied at the private Protestant Jean Sturm Gymnasium in Strasbourg. Around this time in 1901, Stadler became friends with René Schickele. Together with Schickele and other young Alsatian writers including Otto Flake and Jean Arp, they formed Das jüngste Elsaß - an organisation seeking to promote Alsatian culture. The group had a magazine called Der Stürmer, with the first issue published on 1 July 1902.

After graduating from the gymnasium, he enrolled in early 1902 at Strasbourg University where he studied German language and literature, with French and Comparative Literature as his subsidiary subjects. Stadler then went to the Ludwig-Maximilians-Universität München to study philosophy after doing military service in 1902 to 1903. In December 1904, he published his first volume of poetry, Präludien. He was awarded his first doctorate in 1906 from Strasbourg University, and in 1908 was again awarded by the university a higher doctorate.

Stadler was also a German Rhodes Scholar at Magdalen College, Oxford in the United Kingdom from 1906 to 1908, along with some additional time in 1910. He was however not particularly happy living at Magdalen, due to his belittlement by the dons and his social alienation from the college's culture. In mid-1907, Stalder sought permission to spend more time at Oxford as a Rhodes Scholar so he could do a Bachelor of Letters, which was accepted by the Rhodes Trust. After spending more time studying in Germany, he returned to the UK for the 1910 summer term. With his work on the Wieland edition and at Brussels, Stadler fell behind on his Bachelor of Letters dissertation on the history of the criticism of Shakespeare in Germany. He submitted it on 3 December 1911 and was then awarded his Bachelor of Letters on 25 March 1912.

== Career ==
=== Work for academies ===
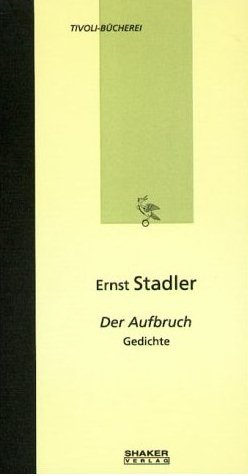
1914 Cover of Der Aufbruch by Stadler

From 12 March 1908 to April 1911, the Prussian Academy of Sciences in Berlin commissioned a three-volume critical edition of Christoph Martin Wieland's works, which involved translations of Shakespeare by Stadler.

In June 1910, the Free University of Brussels offered Stadler an Assistant Lecturer job beginning on 1 October 1911. At Brussels, he worked as a lecturer on German philology. Although Stadler enjoyed the short distance between Paris and Brussels, and being in a French-speaking country, Stadler was unsatisfied working at Brussels and hoped to return to Germany to work. He continued to work at Brussels up to mid-1914, becoming a Senior Lecturer on 29 June 1912. On 23 June 1913, the University of Toronto in Canada made him an offer to become an associate professor in German, which he accepted on the condition that he would be promoted to a full professorship after two years. In around May or June 1914, he left his apartment in Uccle for the last time with the expectation that he would start working at Toronto in September 1914.

=== Writing career ===
Between April and December 1911, Stadler published five articles and seventeen poems (five of which were published in Die Aktion). In 1912, Stadler also began writing reviews of contemporary German literature in Cahiers Alsaciens. In 1913, he began writing more poems for Die Aktion, with many of these later being anthologized in Der Aufbruch (The Awakening), which was published in December 1913. During the same year, Stalder also translated works by Francis Jammes, Charles Péguy, and Honoré de Balzac from French into German.

Detlev W. Schumann of the University of Illinois described Stadler's writing style in 1930 as standing out among other contemporary German expressionists by being more polyphonic, and "unusually suggestive and dynamic."

== World War I and death ==
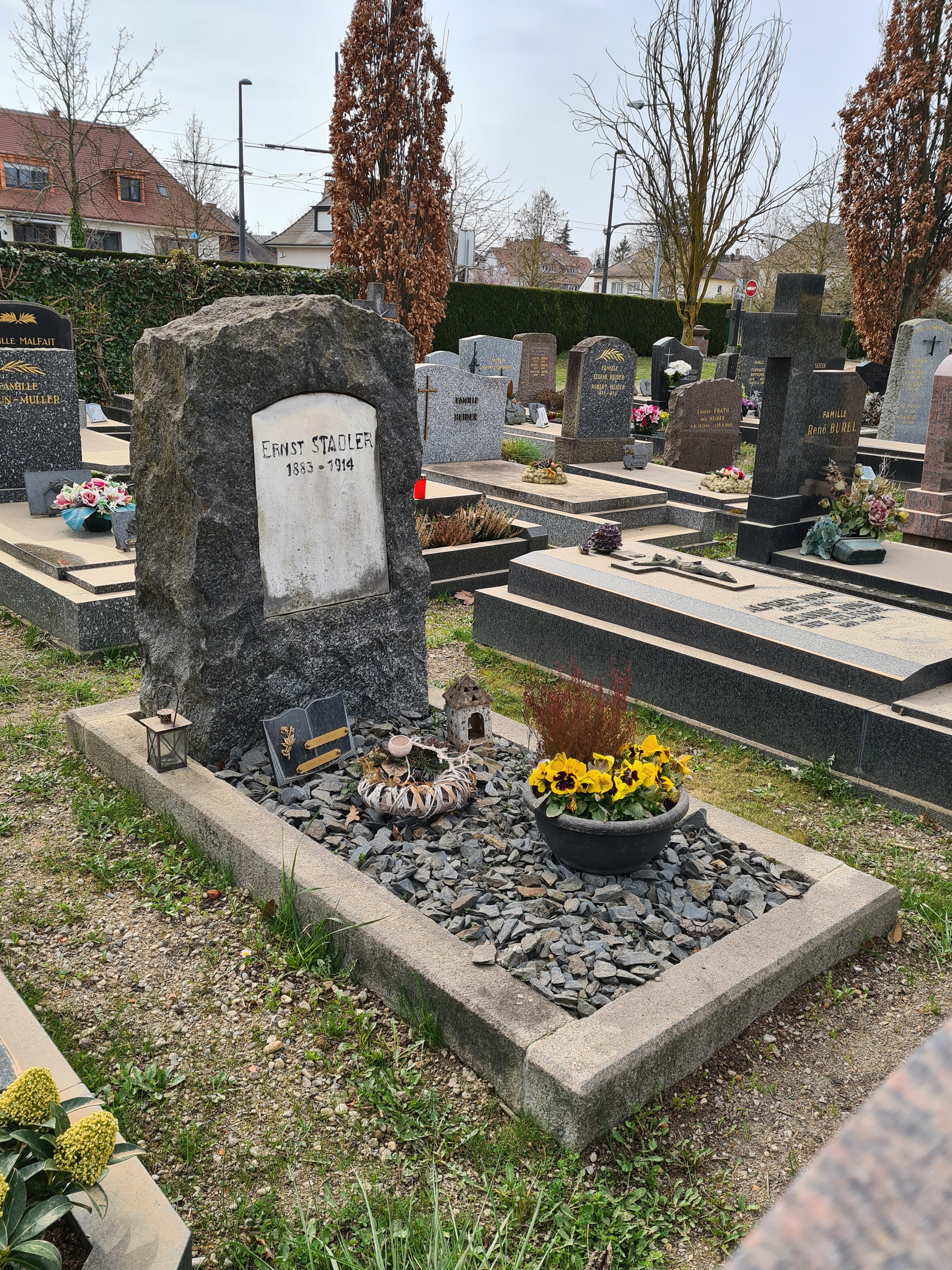
Stadler's grave at the Cimetière Saint-Louis de la Robertsau

Before World War I, Stadler had done military service in Germany between 1902 and 1903 as part of the 2nd Upper Alsatian Field Artillery Regiment No. 51. At the end of his service, he had become a Staff-Sergeant in the army reserve, and in 1907 was promoted to Reserve Lieutenant. When the First World War began, Stadler had to cancel his plans to leave Strasbourg to become an associate professor in German at the University of Toronto. As a reserve lieutenant, he then reported to the 80th field artillery regiment of the XV Army Corps in Colmar.

During the Battle of the Frontiers in early August 1914 when France launched attacks in Alsace-Lorraine, Stadler's regiment was moved to counter the French, although he didn't experience any fighting. Around this time, Stadler began writing his experiences in a war diary, although he witnessed little military action during the battle. In early September, his regiment was transported to Leuven in Belgium, where Stadler was engaged in an attack on Belgian soldiers. In his dairies, he began writing about his disdain for the war, saying "Das Grauenvolle des Krieges. Ich fühle mich schlecht" (The terrifying gruesomeness of the war. I feel sick.). On 30 October 1914, Stadler was killed in Zandvoorde. The Royal Academy of Science, Letters and Fine Arts of Belgium states that he was killed by a Belgian grenade, although Magdalen College said he died as a result of shelling from British artillery.

Stadler was buried on 12 December 1914 in Ruprechtsau, a northern suburb of Strasbourg.

== Sources ==
- Ernst Stadler Der Aufbruch (ed. Heinze Rölleke, Reclam, 1967)
- Gedichte des Expressionismus (ed. Dietrich Bode, Reclam, 1966)
