= René Schickele =

German-French writer, essayist and translator (1883–1940)

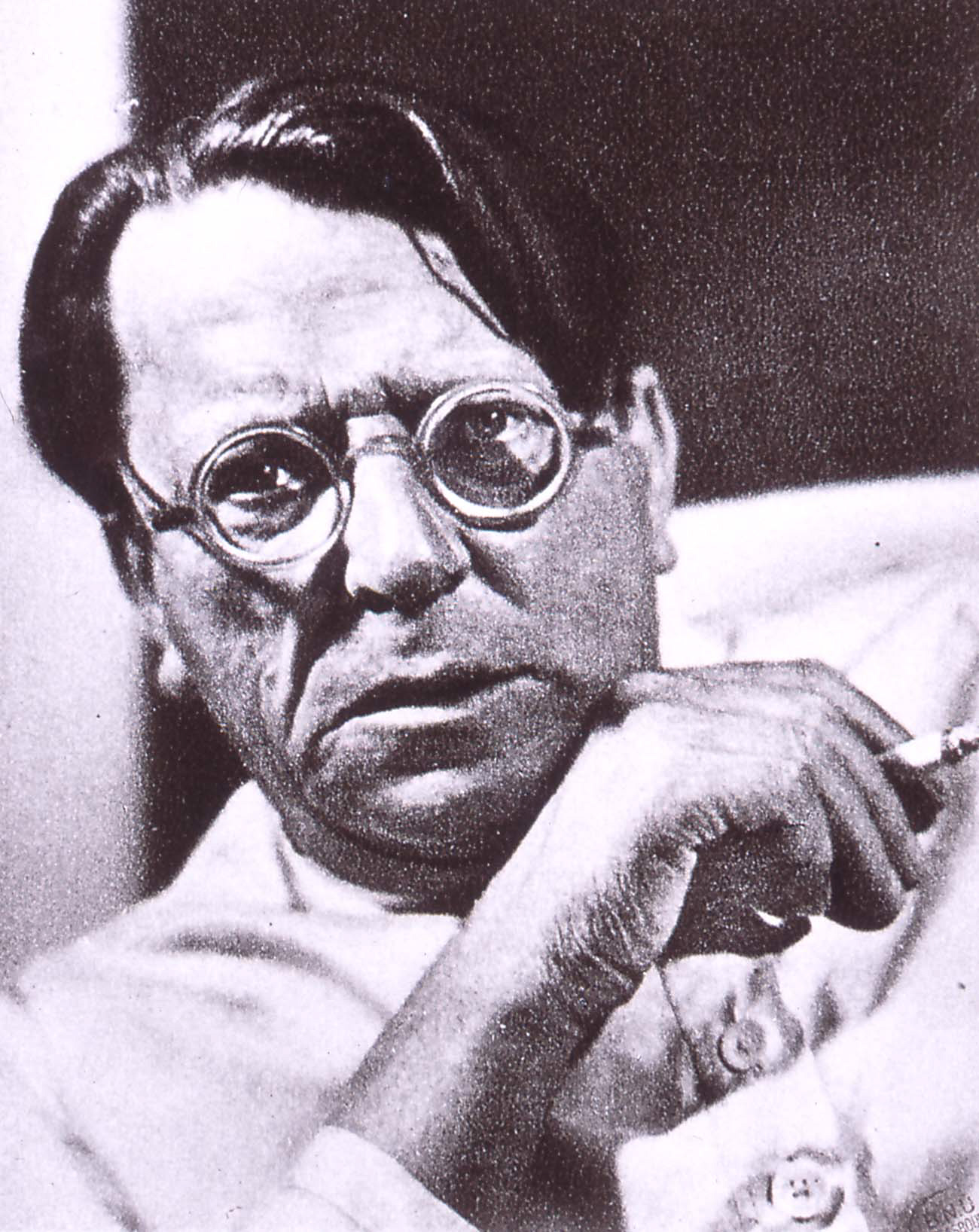
René Schickele (unknown date)

René Schickele (4 August 1883 – 31 January 1940) was a German-French writer, essayist and translator.

Schickele's most famous work is the novel trilogy Das Erbe am Rhein (1925–31): Maria Capponi (1925), Blick auf die Vogesen (1927) and Der Wolf in der Hürde (1931).

== Early life and education ==
Schickele was born in Obernai, Alsace, the son of a German vineyard owner and police officer and a French mother. He studied literature, history, science and philosophy in Strasbourg, Munich, Paris and Berlin.

== Career ==
Together with Otto Flake and Ernst Stadler, he published several magazines as well as poetry. His work as a writer is characterized by tension between French and German culture in Alsace.

After the First World War, he moved to Badenweiler, remaining passionately committed to the understanding between Germany and France. In Badenweiler he met Annette Kolb and Emil Bizer.

As early as 1932 he became aware of the risk of being arrested by the Nazis and emigrated to Sanary-sur-Mer in the South of France.

He only wrote one book in French, Le Retour (1938), expressing his disappointment over the failure of reconciliation between Germany and France.

== Death ==
He died of heart failure in Vence a few months before the invasion of the German army.

== Personal life ==
Schickele married Anna Brandenburg in 1904, with whom he had two sons, Rainer and Hans, born in Germany. He also fathered a daughter with Minna Flake in 1917, Renate "Renée" Miriam Flake.

Schickele was the grandfather of the American composer Peter Schickele and filmmaker David Schickele.

== Works (selection) ==
- Sommernächte. Straßburg 1902.
- Pan. Sonnenopfer der Jugend. Straßburg 1902.
- Mon Repos. Berlin, Leipzig 1905.
- Voltaire u. seine Zeit. Berlin, Leipzig 1905.
- Der Ritt ins Leben. Stuttgart, Berlin, Leipzig, 1906.
- Der Fremde. Berlin 1909.
- Weiß u. Rot. Berlin, 1910.
- Meine Freundin Lo. Berlin 1911. (Erweiterte Fassung 1931).
- Schreie auf dem Boulevard. Berlin 1913.
- Benkal der Frauentröster. Leipzig 1914.
- Die Leibwache. Leipzig 1914.
- Mein Herz mein Land. Leipzig 1915.
- Hans im Schnakenloch. Leipzig 1915.
- Das Glück. Rudolstadt 1919.
- Der neunte November. Berlin 1919.
- Die Genfer Reise. Berlin 1919.
- Wir wollen nicht sterben! München 1922.
- Ein Erbe am Rhein. Berlin 1925 (Späterer Titel: Maria Capponi; Band 1 von Das Erbe am Rhein).
- Symphonie für Jazz. Berlin 1925.
- Blick auf die Vogesen. Berlin 1927 (Band 2 von Das Erbe am Rhein).
- Der Wolf in der Hürde. Berlin 1931 (Band 3 von Das Erbe am Rhein).
- Die Witwe Bosca. Berlin 1933.
- Liebe und Ärgernis des D. H. Lawrence. 1935.
- Die Flaschenpost. Amsterdam 1936.
- Le Retour. 1938.
- Werke in 3 Bänden, herausgegeben von Hermann Kesten. Köln, Berlin 1959.
- Überwindung der Grenze. Essays zur deutsch-französischen Verständigung. Herausgegeben von Adrien Finck. Kehl, Straßburg, Basel 1987. ISBN 3-88571-166-4.
- Großstadtvolk Jahr: k.A.

== Literature ==
- Friedrich Bentmann (Hrsg.): René Schickele. Leben und Werk in Dokumenten. 2. Aufl. Carl-Verlag, Nürnberg 1976, ISBN 3-418-00553-5.
- Albert M. Debrunner: Freunde es war eine elende Zeit! René Schickele in der Schweiz 1915–1919. Huber, Frauenfeld 2004, ISBN 3-7193-1315-8.
- Hanns Heinz Ewers, Victor Hadwiger, Erich Mühsam, René Schickele: Führer durch die moderne Literatur. 300 Würdigungen der hervorragendsten Schriftsteller unserer Zeit. Revonnah Verlag, Hannover 2006, ISBN 3-934818-23-4 (korrigierter und kommentierter Neudruck der Erstausgabe [Berlin 1906] von Arne Glusgold Drews und Danielle Winter).
- Jahre des Unmuts. Thomas Manns Briefwechsel mit René Schickele 1930–1940, hrsg. von Hans Wysling und Cornelia Bernini, Vittorio Klostermann, Frankfurt am Main 1992, ISBN 978-3-465-02517-7
- Annemarie Post-Martens (Hrsg): Rene Schickele. Die blauen Hefte. Edition und Kommentar ("Edition Text"; 5). Stroemfeld Verlag, Frankfurt/M. 2002, ISBN 3-87877-871-6 (2 Bde.).
- Holger Seubert: Deutsch-französische Verständigung: René Schickele. Verlag Eberhard, München 1993, ISBN 3-926777-32-X.
- Hans Wagener: Rene Schickele. Europäer in neun Monaten. Bleicher, Gerlingen 2000, ISBN 3-88350-667-2.
