= Ludwig von Gleichen-Rußwurm =

German painter

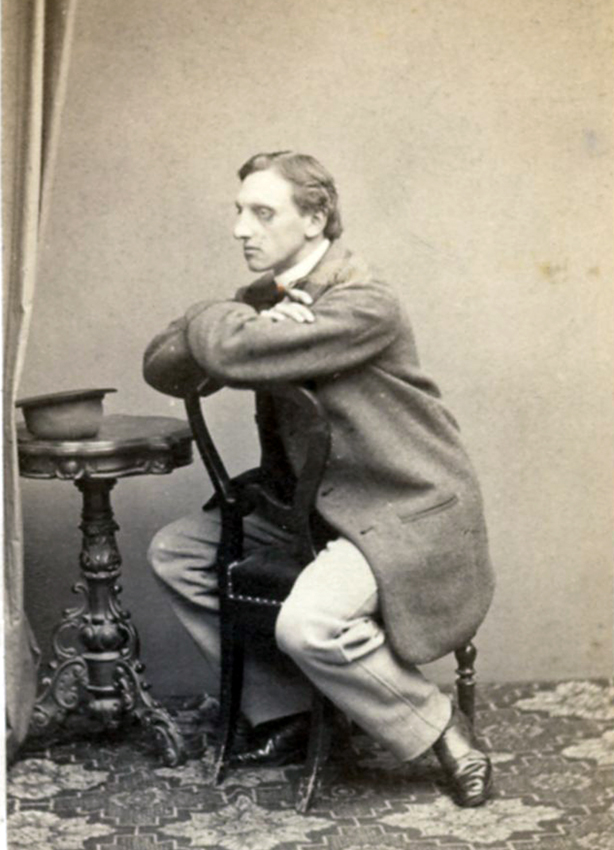
Ludwig von Gleichen-Rußwurm (c.1865)

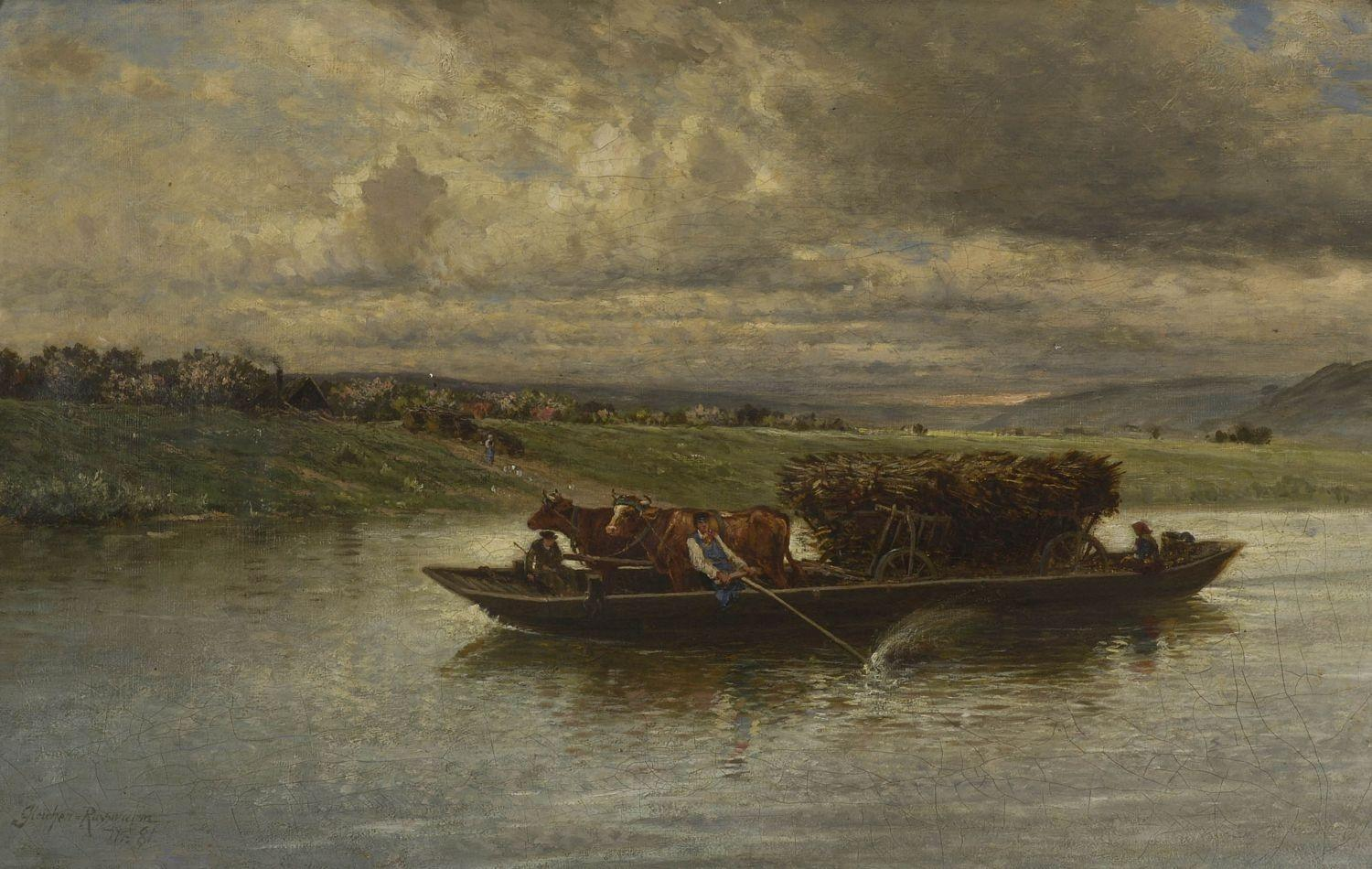
Ferry on the Main River (1897)

Heinrich Ludwig Freiherr von Gleichen-Rußwurm (25 October 1836 – 9 July 1901) was a German impressionist painter and graphic artist who was one of the pioneers of that style in Germany. He was a grandson of Friedrich Schiller.

== Life ==
Gleichen-Rußwurm was born in Castle Greifenstein in Unterfranken. He was the only child of Baron Adalbert von Gleichen-Rußwurm and his wife Emilie, Friedrich Schiller's youngest daughter. King Ludwig I was his godfather. He first attended school in Meiningen, where his family spent the winter and his father had a seat in the Duchy of Saxe-Meiningen's advisory legislature. Later, he studied in Jena, Heidelberg and Geneva, followed by an internship with the Agricultural Academy at the University of Hohenheim.

During a stay in Frankfurt, he met the Baroness Elisabeth von Thienen-Adlerflycht, daughter of the Danish chargé d'affaires, and they were married in 1859. She died shortly after childbirth in 1865. Their son, Alexander von Gleichen-Rußwurm, became a well-known writer and philosopher. His sense of loss led him to pursue his artistic inclinations. Leaving Alexander in the care of his mother Emilie, he moved into an apartment with a studio in Weimar, studying with Max Schmidt and Theodor Hagen at the Weimar Saxon-Grand Ducal Art School. In 1872, he had his first exhibition in Berlin. During a stay in France in 1876, he came under the influence of the Barbizon school and developed an interest in etching.

After 1880, he spent the winter in Berlin and travelled extensively during the summer. Together with Alexander, he participated in creating the Goethe-Schiller Archive, donating items from his family's collection. In 1889, he was named an honorary member of the Goethe-Gesellschaft and, five years later, was elected Chairman of the Deutsche Schillerstiftung. He died in Weimar in 1901.
