= Flakne =

Flakne is a surname. Notable people with the surname include:

- Gary Flakne (1934–2016), American politician
- Gunn Elin Flakne (born 1964), Norwegian politician
- Torstein Flakne (born 1960), Norwegian singer and guitarist

== See also ==
- Flake (disambiguation)
