= Fleck (disambiguation) =

Fleck may refer to:

- Fleck (name), a surname
- Ludwik Fleck Polish and Israeli physician, biologist and philosopher
- Ludwik Fleck Prize (Fleck Prize), an annual science and technology prize
- Norma Fleck Award (Fleck Award), an annual Canadian children's non-fiction literary award
- Fleck Family Foundation, the sponsor of the Norma Fleck Award
- Fleck/Paterson House (Fleck House), a building in Ottawa, Ontario, Canada

== Other uses ==
- Fleck corneal dystrophy (Francois-Neetens speckled corneal dystrophy), a corneal dystrophy where small flecks in the stroma is a symptom
- Carnation necrotic fleck virus (CNFV), a plant virus
- Sunfleck, intermittent flecks of sunlight

== See also ==
- Flecker (surname)
- Flake (disambiguation)
