= Zandvoorde, Zonnebeke =

Zandvoorde
- Deelgemeente
- Coordinates: 50°48′46″N 2°58′52″E
- Country: Belgium
- Province: West Flanders
- Municipality: Zonnebeke

Area
  - Total: 6.68 km^{2} (2.58 sq mi)

Population (1999)
  - Total: 474
- Source: NIS
- Postal code: 8980

Zandvoorde (West Flemish: Zanvôorde) is a village in the Belgian province of West Flanders and a part (deelgemeente) of the municipality of Zonnebeke. Zandvoorde is a rural village, in the rolling landscape of the southern part of the province.

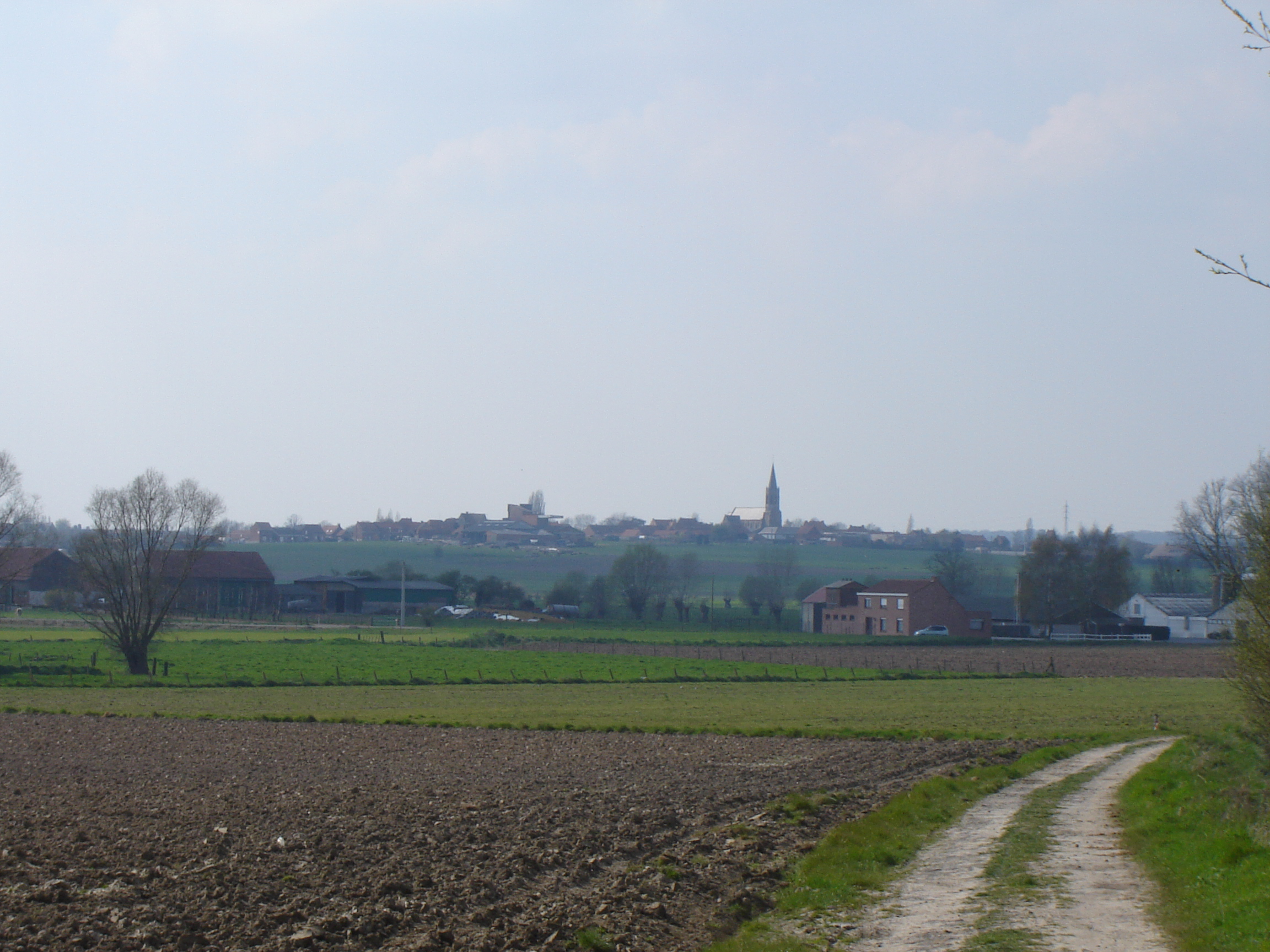
View on Zandvoorde

== History ==
Old listings of the place date back to 1102, as Sanfort. "Sant" refers to sand (in modern Dutch: zand), "fort" refers to Ford (in modern Dutch: voorde), a shallow crossing in a watercourse.

The village was completely destroyed during World War I. Among those killed there was the German poet Ernst Stadler, drafted to the German army.

== Landmarks ==
- The Parish and its church are named after Saint Bartholomew. The current church dates from 1923–1925, after the old church had been destroyed during the First World War.
- The Zantvoorde British Cemetery is a Commonwealth War Graves Commission World War I military cemetery. In the village centre, there is a British war memorial, The Household Cavalry Monument.

== Trivia ==
- In the north of the province of West Flanders, there's another village with the name Zandvoorde, a part of the city of Ostend
