= D'r Hans im Schnokeloch =

Alemannic folk song from Alsace

D'r Hans im Schnokeloch

D'r Hans im Schnokeloch ("Hans in the midge pit") is an Alemannic folk song from Alsace which can be traced back to the middle of the 19th century. The lyrics are versatile, but commonly regard the notoric unsatisfaction of the song's character Hans.

Originating from around Strasbourg, the song spread throughout Alsace and abroad. Aside from being a folk and children's song, it was increasingly seen as a metaphor for the ambivalent history of Alsace and is considered an "unofficial anthem". It further inspired notable writers, resulting in multiple stage plays based on the song.

== Background and history ==
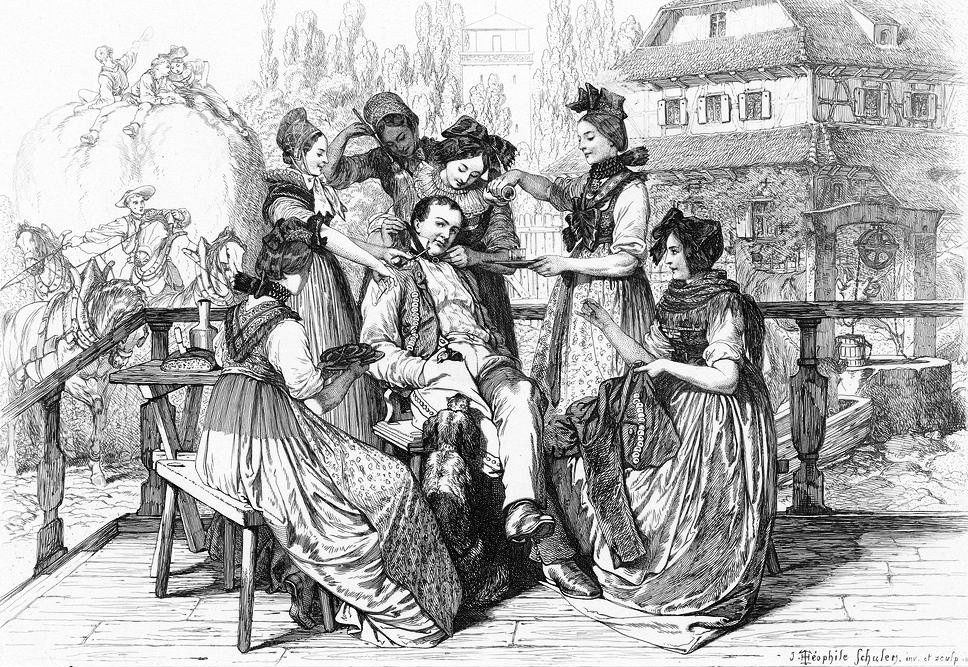
Hans im Schnockeloch, etching by Théophile Schuler (1821–1878). One may recognise the Breuscheckschlössel in the background.

=== Myth ===
According to a common narrative, the lyrics were dedicated to a landlord named Hans, who kept an inn at Koenigshoffen near Strasbourg. Originally, the lyrics may have serenaded Hans' mercurial (dis)ability to satisfy his guests' wishes. Later on, the lyrics were alternated to reflect Hans' temper. The melody was a common folk tune at the time, with many lyrics sung to it. The Elsässisches Sagenbuch of 1842 by August Stöber marks the first known printing of the song.

=== The Schnokeloch area ===
Schnokeloch ("midge pit") (48.57620°N 7.71327°E) is a former wetland in the Koenigshoffen district of Strasbourg, to the west of the city's old town. The Rue du Schnokeloch runs through the area, the name of which can be traced back to 1817, as well as the Muhlbach river, a confluence of the Bruche. In the local dialects, Schnoke refers to mosquitos; Loch may refer to the once marshy character. Near Schnokeloch lie the Breuscheckschlössel (48.57647°N 7.71445°E), which is often included in visual art dedicated to the folk song, and the Cimetière Saint-Gall (48.57854°N 7.72096°E), cited as the burial place of Hans.

== Lyrics ==
=== Alemannic lyrics ===
The most famous rhyme was first printed in 1842 in the Elsässisches Sagenbuch by August Stöber, which describes it as "a folk song well-known in Alsace" ("ein im Elsasse altbekanntes Volkslied").

Der Hans im Schnockeloch hett Alles was er will!
Und was er hett, diß will er nitt,
Und was er will, diß hett er nitt.
Der Hans im Schnockeloch hett Alles was er will!

Hans in the midge pit has everything he wants!
And what he has, he does not want,
And what he wants, he does not have
Hans in the midge pit has everything he wants!

These lines are followed by six additional rhymes contributed by Adolf Stöber, the editor's brother. They are tragic and moralising in character: Hans, never satisfied, misses a good life with his wife and farmyard, only to be struck with bad fate. The song ends with Hans dead and buried, and a prompt to be frugal and devoted to God.

Er isch e richer Bur, unn 's gfallt em nimm sin Hus;
Abriße loßt er sin Gebei,
Unn stellt sich funkelnauelnei
E Hus mit Schir unn Stall an's Gallebriechel nus.

Unn in der erste Nacht, uff einmol ruft's: Firio!
Sin Hus verbrennt, unn d'Stallung mit –
Unn was er will, diß hett er nitt.
Jez leit sin neier Beau – e Kohlehuffe – do.

Er hett e sufri Frau, getreu in Glück unn Nod,
Rechtschaffe, so wie's weni gitt:
Doch was er hett, diß will er nitt –
Er loßt sie sitze dheim, bis sie sich grämt ze Dod.

Jez bli't em noch sin Guet. Was macht er? Schla uff Schla
Verkauft er Alles, Matt unn Feld,
Unn macht sin ganzi Hab ze Geld,
Unn setzt sich uff e Schiff for nooch Amerika.

Was gschicht? e Sturm bricht los; unn in der letschte Nod
Küm schwimmt er selbst an's Ufer noch;
Kummt bettelarm in's Schnockeloch,
Unn schafft als Bureknecht bedrüebt um's däili Brod.

Unn ze Sant-Galle druß, dort hett er jezt sin Grab:
Unn was er hett, diß mueß er han,
Unn war er will, er kann's nitt han –
Drum leb zefridde doch mit Gott unn diner Hab!

He is a rich farmer, and he no longer likes his house;
He has his building torn down
And puts, brand spanking new
A house with barn and stable at the Gallenbreuschlein

And in the first night, suddenly a shout: Fire!
His house burns down, and the stable with it—
And what he wants, he does not have.
Now his new build—a pile of coals—lies there.

He has a clean wife, loyal in joy and trouble,
Righteous, with not many alike:
But what he has, he does not want—
He lets her sit at home, until she grieves to death.

Now he remains with just his farm. What does he do? Blow by blow
He sells everything, meadow and field,
And turns his entire property into money,
And puts himself on a ship to America.

What happens? A storm arises; and in the final minute
He barely swims to the shore;
Arrives at Schnokeloch destituted,
And works as farmhand, worried about his daily bread.

And out at St. Gallen, he now has his grave:
And what he has, he must keep,
And what he wants, he cannot have—
So live thankfully with God and your belongings!

Some common rhymes adopt the contrarily scheme of the origianal lines: "And what he says, he does not think, and what he thinks, he does not say"—"And what he can do, he does not do, and what he does, he does not accomplish"—"And what he does, he should not do, and what he should do, he does not do" (Un was er saat, diss denkt er nit, un was er denkt, diss saat er nit—Un was er kann, diss macht er nit, und was er macht, gerot im nit—Un was er duet, diss soll er nit, un was er soll, diss duet er nit).

There further are rhymes with obscene or macabre matter, dealing with Hans having a midge stuck in his anus ("De Hans het e Schnoog im Loch und bringt si nimmi rus") or him going insane, jumping from a window and ending up in a "fools' house" (mental asylum).

Der Hans im Schnoogeloch,
der het des Läwe satt.
Und läwe, sait er, kann er nit,
un stärwe, sait er, will er nit:
er hopst us'm Fenschter nus
und kummt in s Narrehus.

Hans in the midge pit
is fed up with life.
And live, he says, he cannot,
and die, he says, he does not want to:
He jumps from the window
and ends up in the fools' house.

In the German-speaking part of Switzerland, the lyrics usually depict Hans im Schnäggeloch ("Hans in the snail pit").

=== French lyrics ===
A number of French rhymes have been established. There are singable translations of the Alemannic original (Le Hans de Schnokeloch), as well as inventive ones. For an example, one rhyme depicts Hans beating up a witch.

Le Hans de Schnokeloch
Il n'a pas peur du tout
La nuit quand il entend le loup
Ou la sorcière ou le hibou
Il sort bravement
Et s'en va leur donner des coups.

Hans in the midge pit
He is not afraid of anything
At night, when he hears the wolf
Or the witch or the owl
He bravely gets out
And gives her some beatings.

== Spread and significance ==
In Alsace, the song gained meaning as an expression of local patriotism and has even been described as a "local anthem". The region has been a theatre of war in many modern conflicts, its national affiliation switching between France and Germany multiple times. Hans im Schnokeloch became a metaphor for a portion of Alsatians who felt neither distinctively French nor German, his temper allegedly representing the Alsatian mind. French writer, theologian and lawyer Frederic Hoffet wrote the following in his essay Psychanalyse de l'Alsace:

Ces mots traduisent admirablement l'insatisfaction essentielle de l'Alsacien, ce quelque chose de flottant, d'incertain qui explique ses brusques et mystérieux retournements. Il ne sait pas où il va. Il en est toujours à se chercher.

[These words admirably translate the essential insatisfaction of the Alsatian, that drifting, uncertain something that explains his brisk and mysterious turns. He does not know where he goes. He is always on the search for himself.]

— Frederic Hoffet, Psychanalyse de l'Alsace

In 2019, during a discussion in the French National Assembly regarding the creation of the European Collectivity of Alsace, deputy Thierry Michels (La République En Marche) expressed his support for the collectivity by singing D'r Hans im Schnokeloch. Caroline Fiat (La France insoumise) iterrupted him, exclaiming that "the language of France is French" ("La langue de la République est le français !"), and he was reminded by the assembly's president that regional languages shall not be used in the chamber.

The song became known beyond Alsace. It is a famemous folk and children's song in much of the Alemannic language area.

== Stage plays ==
The character of Hans im Schnokeloch served as an inspiration for multiple stage plays, whereof D'r Hans im Schnokeloch (1903) by Ferdinand Bastian and Hans im Schnakenloch (1915) by René Schickele gained considerable publicity. Alsatian comedian Germain Muller picked up the character of Hans, as did Andrew Bond for his children's musical De Hans im Schnäggeloch (2013).

=== D'r Hans im Schnokeloch (1903) ===
In 1903, Alsatian dialect poet Ferdinand Bastian published D'r Hans im Schnokeloch, descriped as "a folk play in 4 acts". The work is based on the rhymes by Adolf Stöber found in the Elsässisches Sagenbuch, making a tragicomedy with musical numbers. In the third act in particular, many regional folk songs are sung, including D'r Hans im Schnokeloch itself. Dialogues are written in the Alsatian dialect, with many French loanwords and archaic honorifics.

In the year 1922, a silent film adoption was produced. In 1928, the author received congratulations for the piece's 1000th performance.

==== Plot ====
Hans is a young, depressed landowner, who loses his composure following the slightest blemishes, insults his fellows with cynical remarks and feels a heavy world-weariness. He is running his farm with his aunts Lehn and Angenes, as well as the broken farmhand Casper. His aunts believe that Hans would gain more stability by marrying a woman. He, however, rather dreams of owning a big house or emigrating to America, like his friend François. Merely his cousin Urschel evokes some romantic feelings in him. Following an eventful pairing at the hands of Lehn, Hans eventually marries Urschel, begets a child with her and builds himself a new house, financed by selling a mooncalf. At the child's baptism, a fire breaks out at the Schnokeloch, whereupon Hans frustratedly deserts his family to emigrate to America. He returns to Strasbourg five years later as a bedraggled man, only a short moment after Urschel leaves to live with her cousin and new husband Grosskost. He asks Lehn and Casper to not tell anybody about his return, and bids farewell forever.

=== Hans im Schnakenloch (1915) ===
In 1915, German-French writer René Schickele published his expressionist Drama Hans im Schnakenloch, which deals with the fate of the Alsatian people during the eruption of the First World War. The work is considered the first German drama to reference the war, and is thought to reflect Schickele's pacifism.

Adored by the general audience, the work has been banned by German and Austrian authorities, or heavily censored to please them. In the German Empire, the piece even gained the attention of the Oberste Heeresleitung; Erich Ludendorff used his influence to thwart the play's approval by German censorship.

==== Plot ====
Hans Boulanger is a restless, high-handed man who cheats his wife, neglects his children, undertakes lavish journeys and ruins the Schnakenloch, the land he inherited from his father, with poor decisions. The start of the First World War splits the Boulanger family apart: Hans is not fit for military service due to health problems and refuses to leave his land. His brother is serving in the Imperial German Army as a Leutnant. His mother identifies as French, yet prays for his fighting son. Hans' German wive is driven by the love of her family, despite Hans cheating and hurting her repeatedly. When the fighting action arrives at the Schnakenloch, Hans is struck by a death wish. He decides to abruptly desert his land and family, looking forward to die on the battlefield as a French soldier.

== Literature ==
- Führe, Uli; Pflaum, Stefan (2012), Woni sing und stand (in German), Karlsruhe: G. Braun Buchverlag, pp. 88–89, 236–237, ISBN 978-3-7650-8620-5
- Loesch, Jeanne (1999), Lorentz, Albert (ed.), "D'r Hans im Schnokeloch", Kocherschbari (in German), no. 39, pp. 70–71, ISSN 0243-2498
- Périllon, Marie-Christine; Schneider, Malou (1993), Traditions strasbourgeoises (in French), Paris: Éditions Bonneton, pp. 181–183, ISBN 2-86253-153-7
- Hess, Carl (ed.), Ringe ringe Rose! – Ein Liederbuch für die Schweizerkinder, ihre Mütter und Lehrer (in German), Basel: Helbing & Lichtenhahn, p. 13
