= Minna Flake =

German-American physician

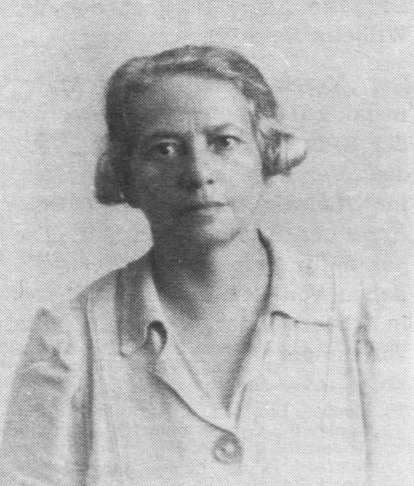
- Portrait of Flake, c. 1920
- Born: Margareta Mai; November 27, 1886; Würzburg, German Empire
- Died: February 12, 1958 (aged 71); New York City, New York, U.S.
- Education: University of Würzburg; University of Berlin
- Occupations: Physician, activist
- Political party: Independent Social Democratic Party of Germany; Communist Party of Germany; Opposition Communist Party of Germany; Socialist Workers' Party of Germany
- Spouse: Otto Flake (m. 1907; div. 1911)
- Children: 2

Margareta "Minna" Flake (née Mai; November 27, 1886 – February 12, 1958) was a German born physician and socialist who fled Germany during World War II and settled in New York City.

== Early life ==
Margareta Mai was born on November 27, 1886, in Würzburg in the German Empire. She was the youngest of four children born to David Mai, a Jewish grain merchant, and his wife, Berta Mai.

She undertook medical studies from the University of Würzburg, graduating in 1911, and the University of Berlin, graduating in 1915, and becoming a doctor in 1920.

== Career ==
After becoming a doctor, she practiced in Berlin. Prior to the rise of Adolf Hitler, Minna served as the chief health officer of the city of Berlin for more than ten years. At the time, she was well known in Berlin and was particularly focused on welfare work and abortion issues as a pediatrician. She was initially involved with the Independent Social Democratic Party of Germany, a short-lived party in the Weimar Republic established in 1917 as the result of a split of left wing members of the Social Democratic Party of Germany that attempted to chart a centrist course between electorally oriented revisionism on the one hand and Bolshevism on the other. She later joined the Communist Party of Germany, until her exclusion in 1927, thereafter joining the Opposition Communist Party of Germany until she joined the Socialist Workers' Party of Germany around 1932.

During the Weimar Republic, she was considered Jewish by the Nazis and was dismissed on April 19, 1929. Four years later on April 8, 1933, she was arrested by the Gestapo on charges of hiding Nazi opponents and performing abortions.

Upon her release from custody, and that of her politically active daughter from juvenile custody, she fled Germany via Switzerland and Czechoslovakia to France in May 1933 along with Claude Lévi-Strauss, Victor Serge, André Breton, Jacqueline Lamba, Germaine Krull. Lacking her diplomas and work permits, she could only find occasional work and semi-legal practice in Paris and "remained militantly anti-Nazi." In 1941, she left France with her family on a cargo ship bound for New York, arriving in New York, via Martinique, on May 29, 1941. She was admitted to medical practice by the state of New York in 1951, where she became a citizen in 1952.

== Personal life ==
In 1907, Minna married German writer Otto Flake (1880–1963), with whom she had a son, Thomas Flake, who was born in 1908. They marriage lasted until 1911. In 1917, she had a daughter, Renate "Renée" Miriam Flake, with German-French writer and essayist, René Schickele, a former colleague of her husband who she met in Florence in 1907.

Flake died on February 12, 1958, at Beekman-Downtown Hospital in New York City, leaving a daughter and two grandchildren.
