= Lichtentaler Allee =

Historic park and arboretum in Baden-Württemberg, Germany

Coordinates: 48°45′35″N 8°14′19″E

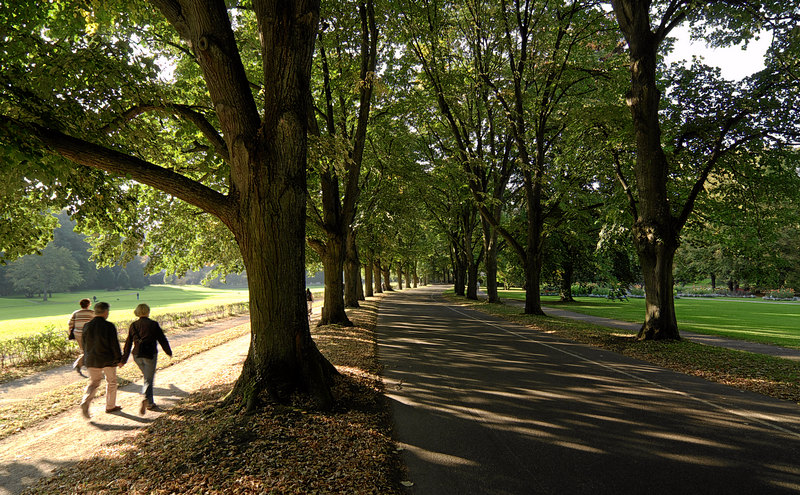
Lichtentaler Allee

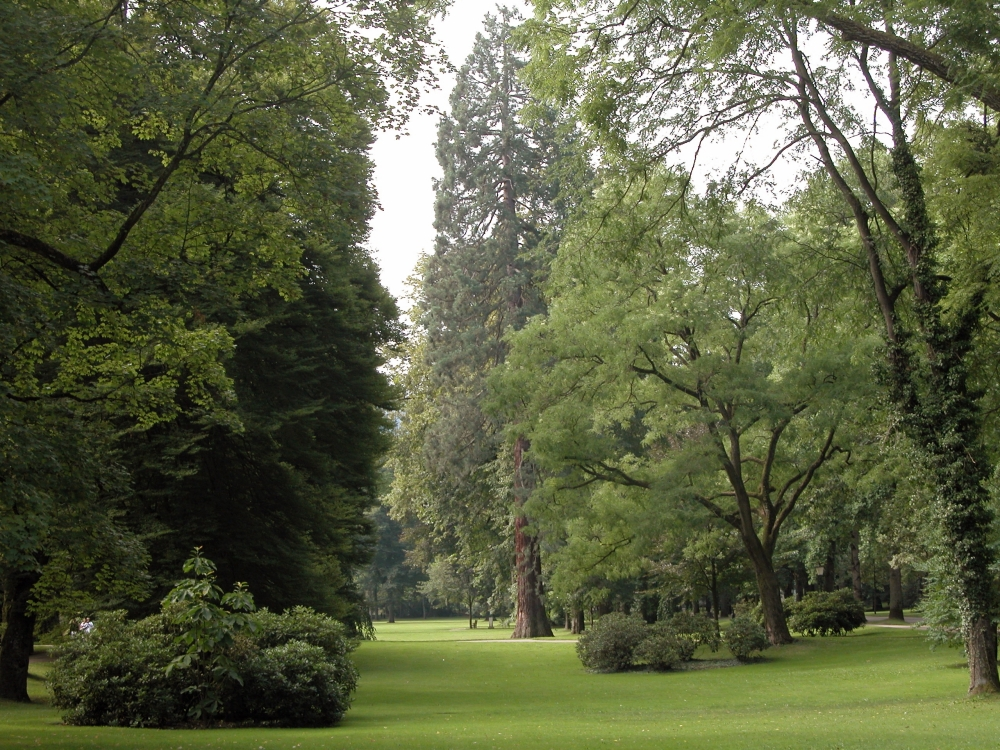
Parkland on the Lichtentaler Allee

The Lichtentaler Allee is a historic park and arboretum, set out as a 2.3 kilometer strolling avenue along the west bank of the river Oos in Baden-Baden, Baden-Württemberg, Germany. It is open daily without charge.

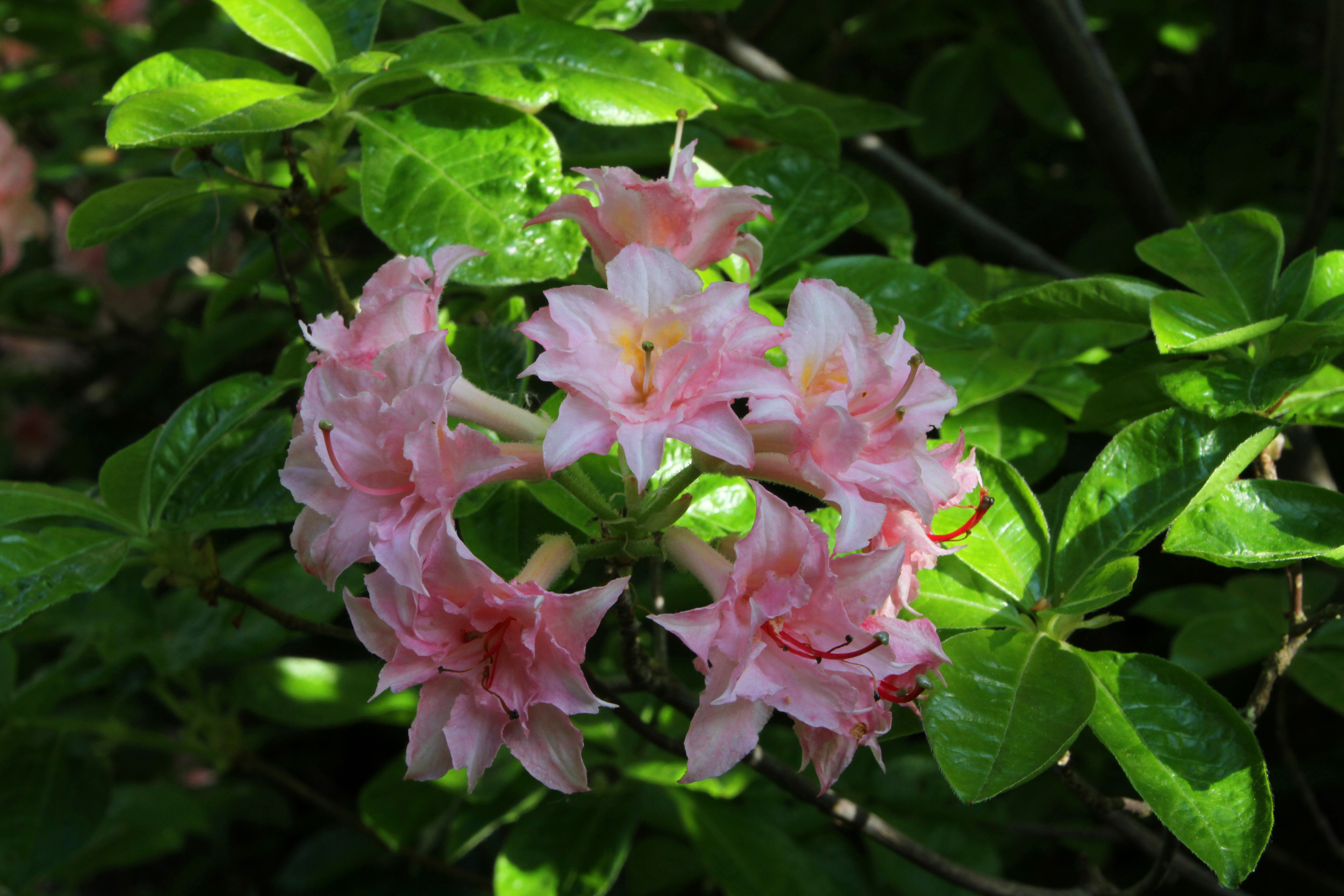
Azaleas

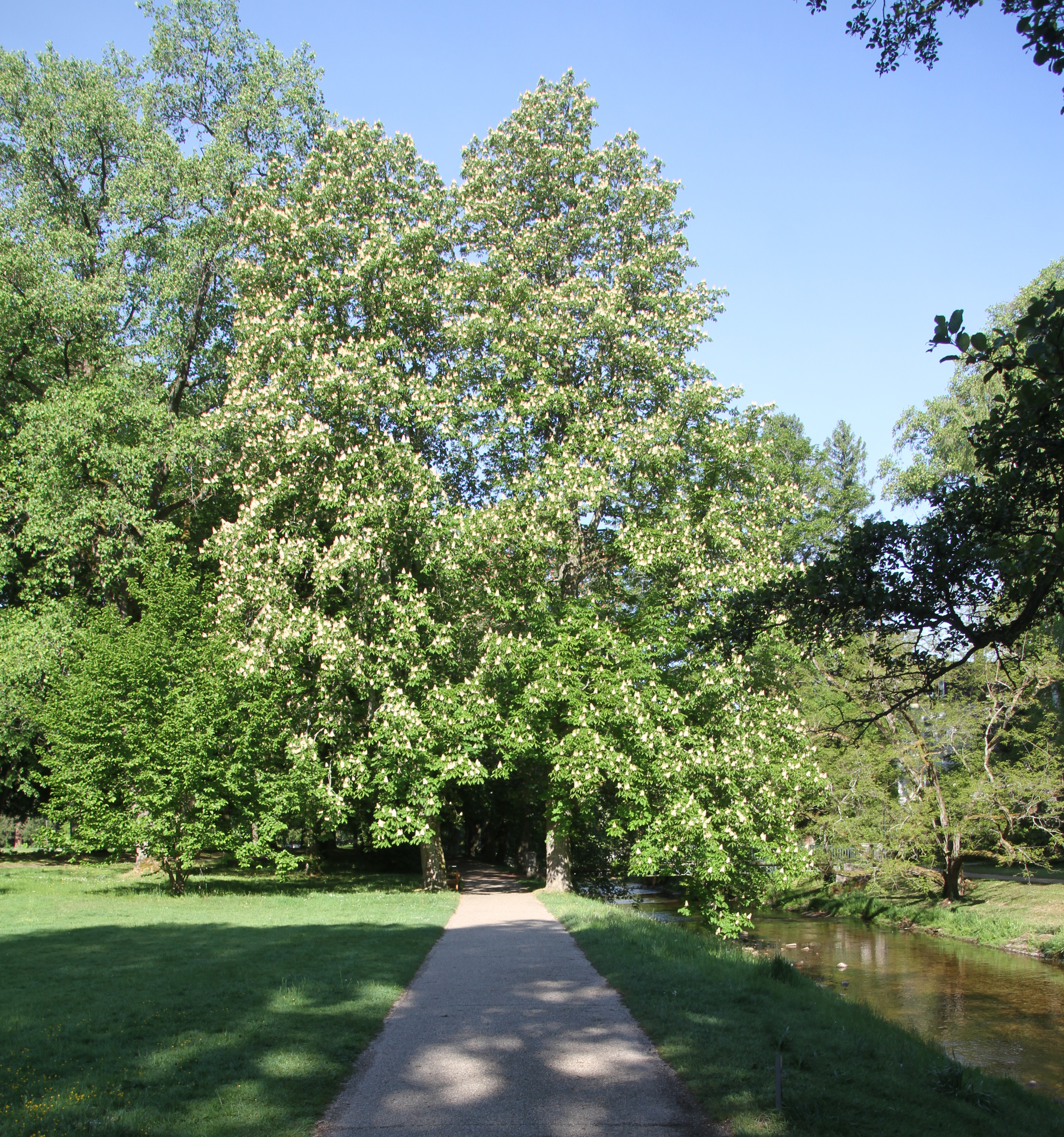
Chestnuts

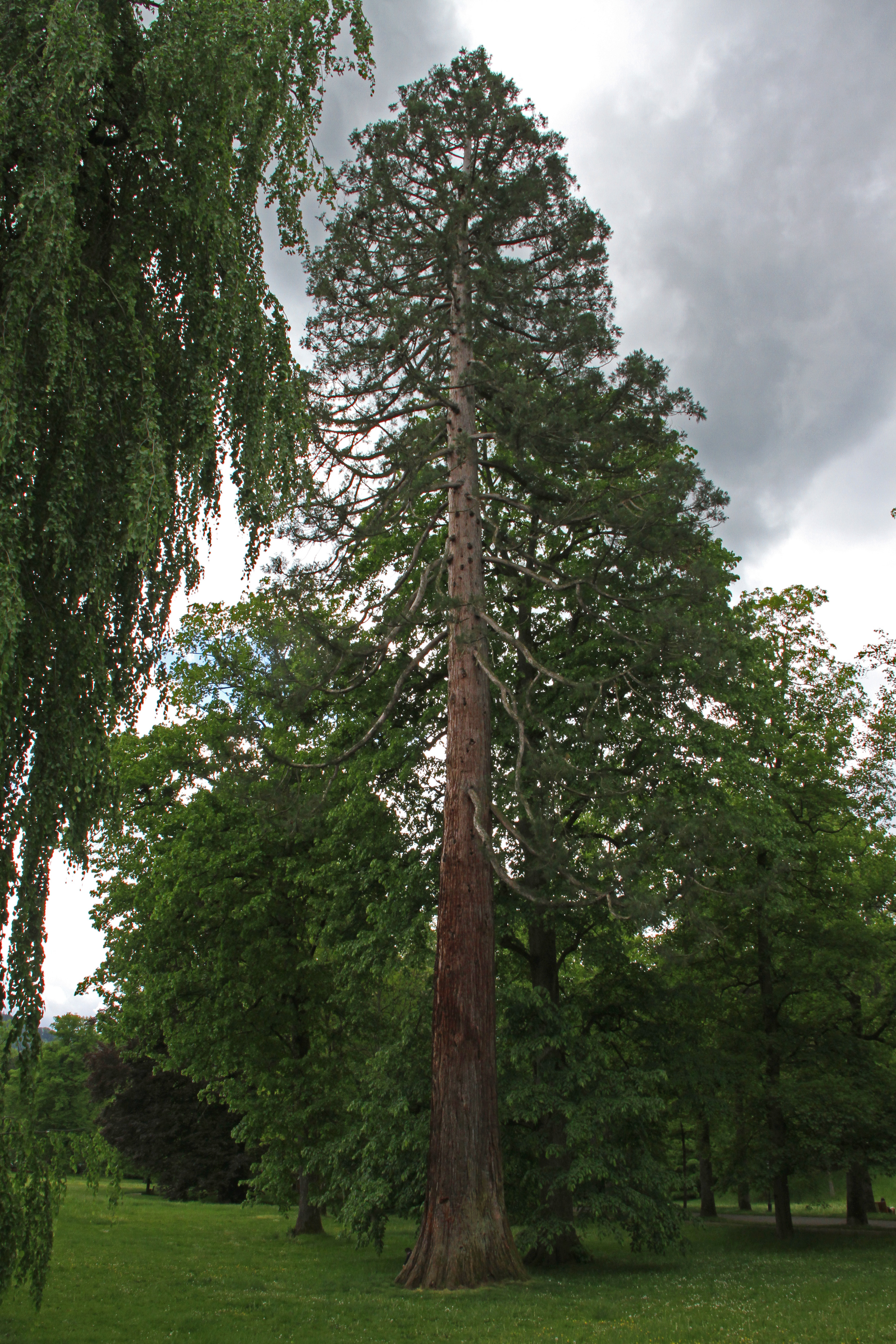
Sequoia giganteum

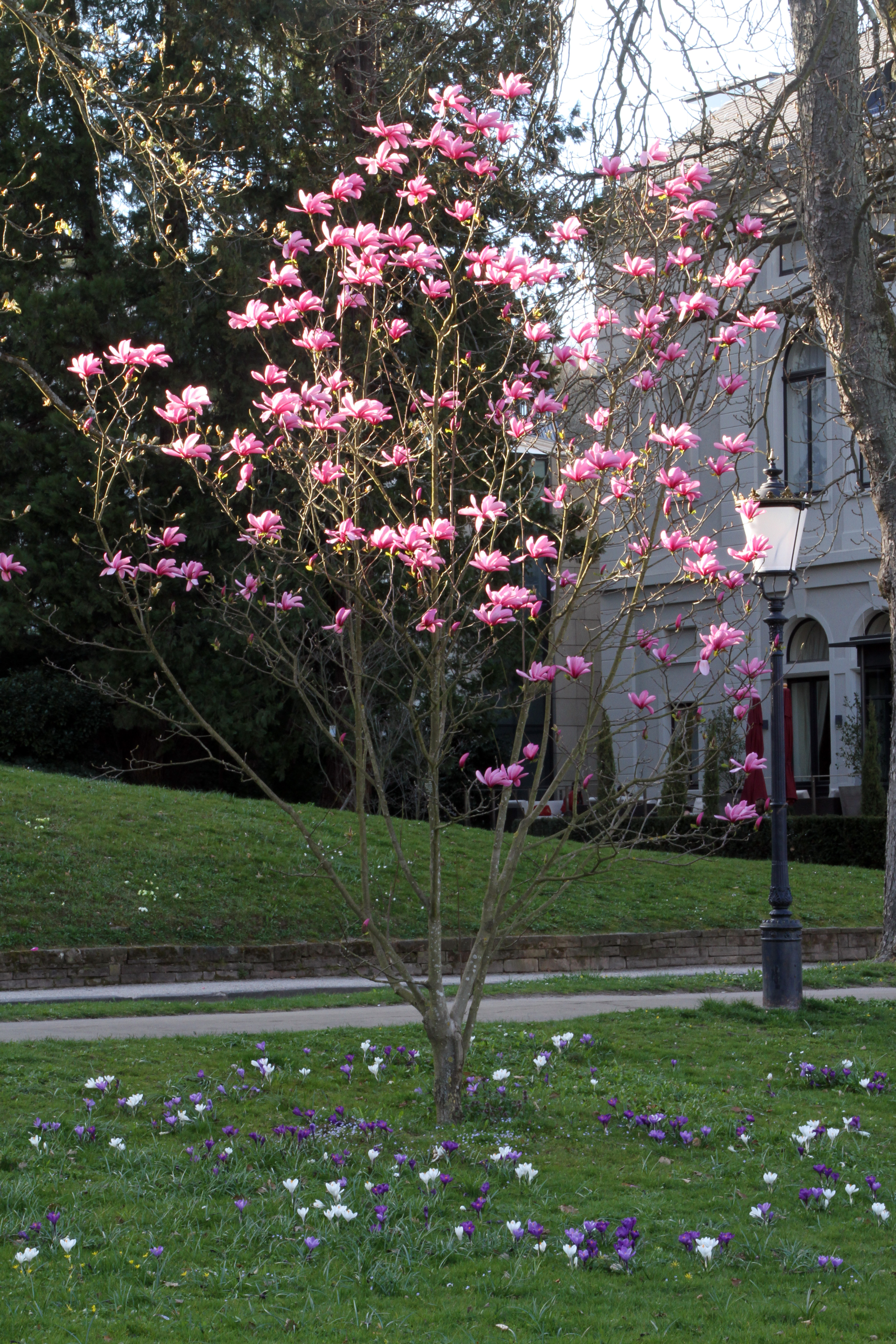
Magnolia

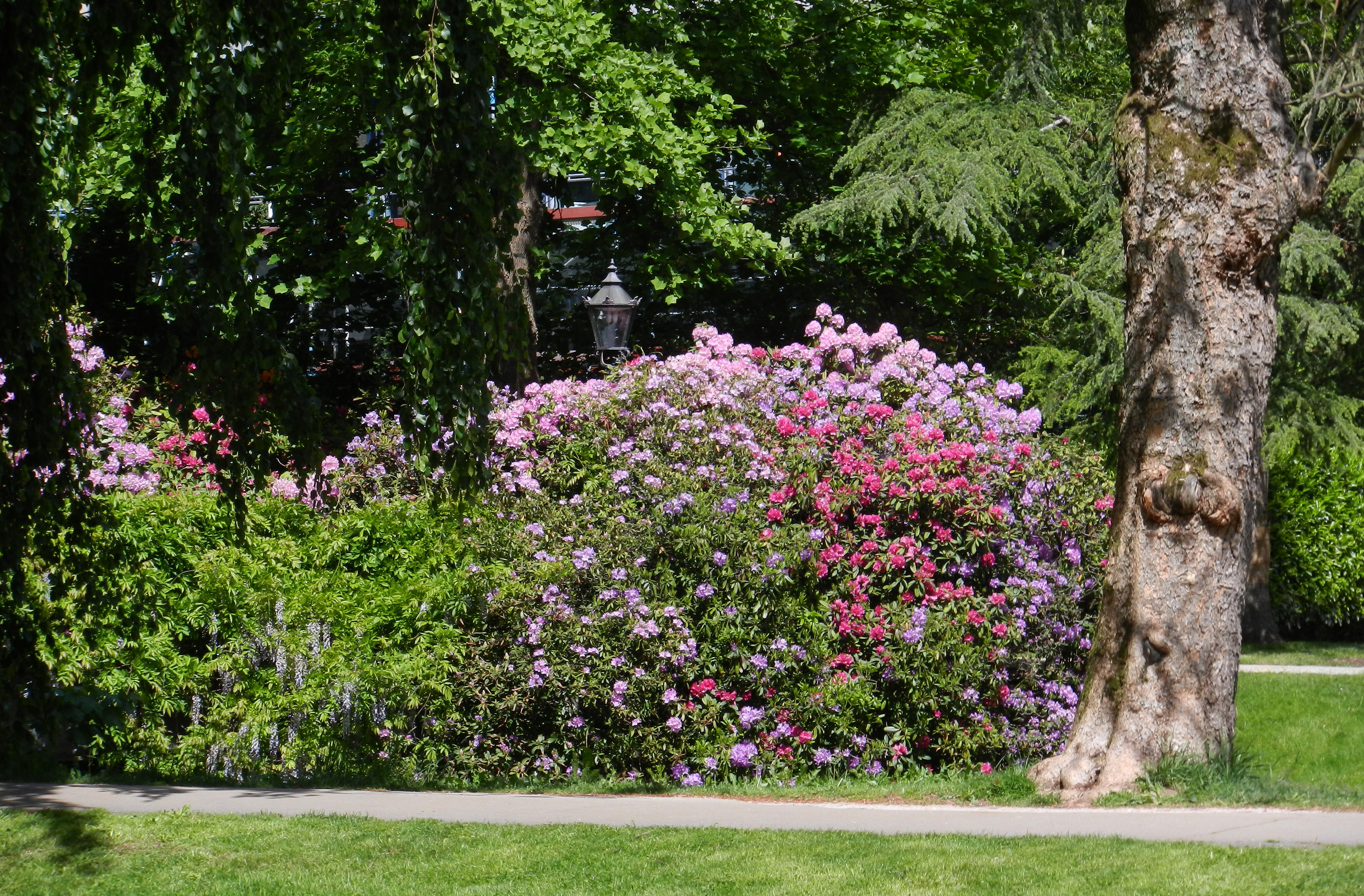
Rhododendron

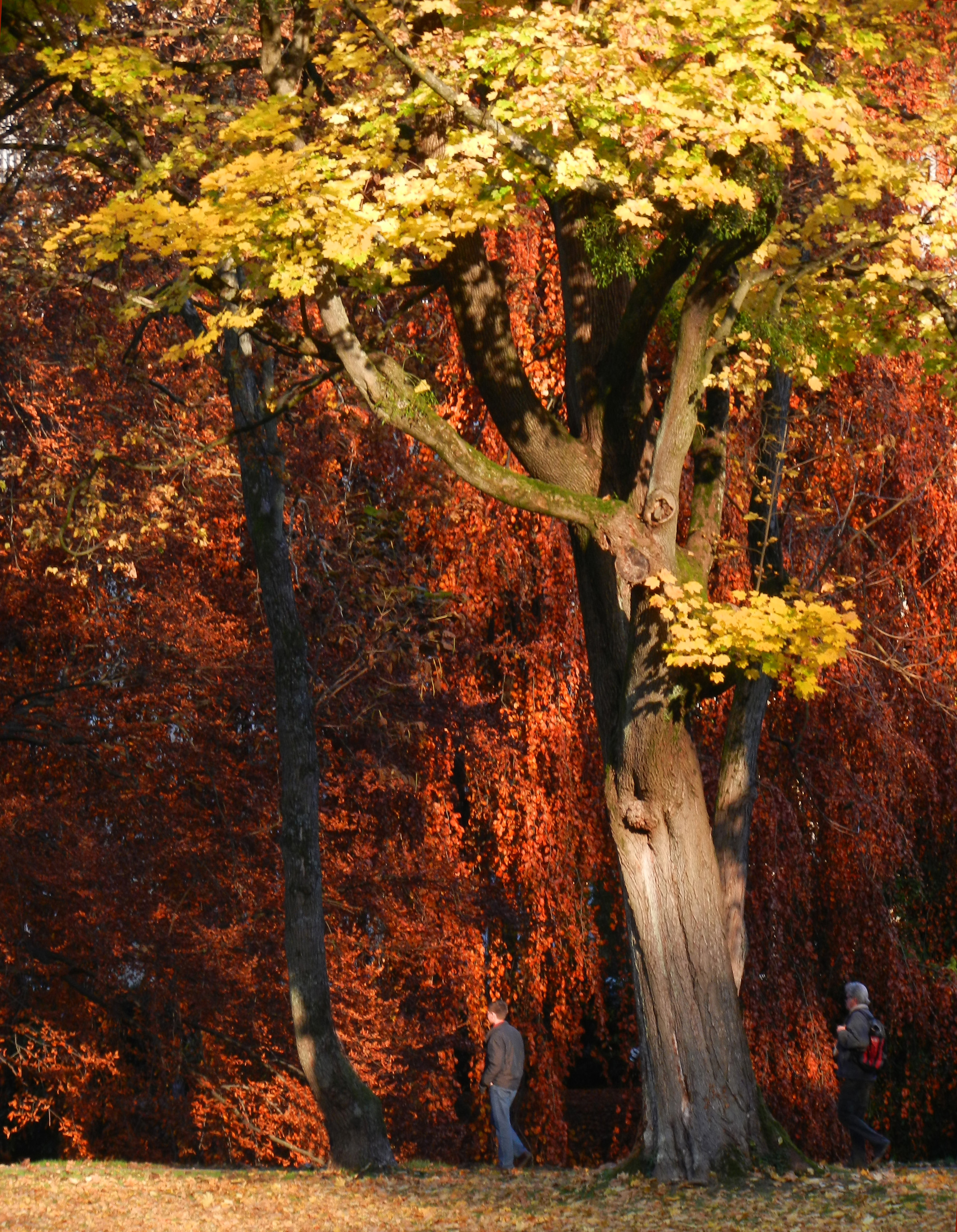
Maple and beech

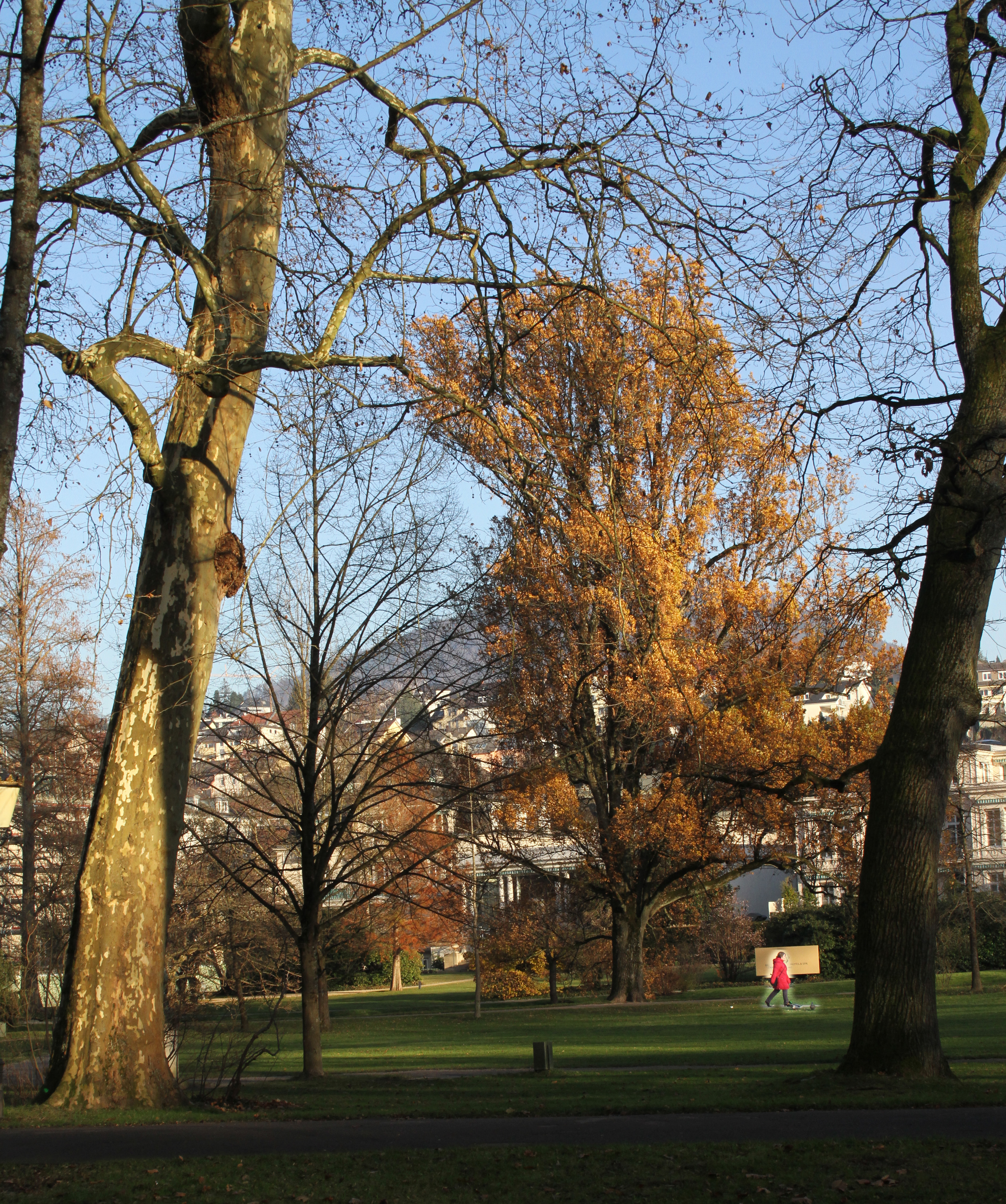
Oak

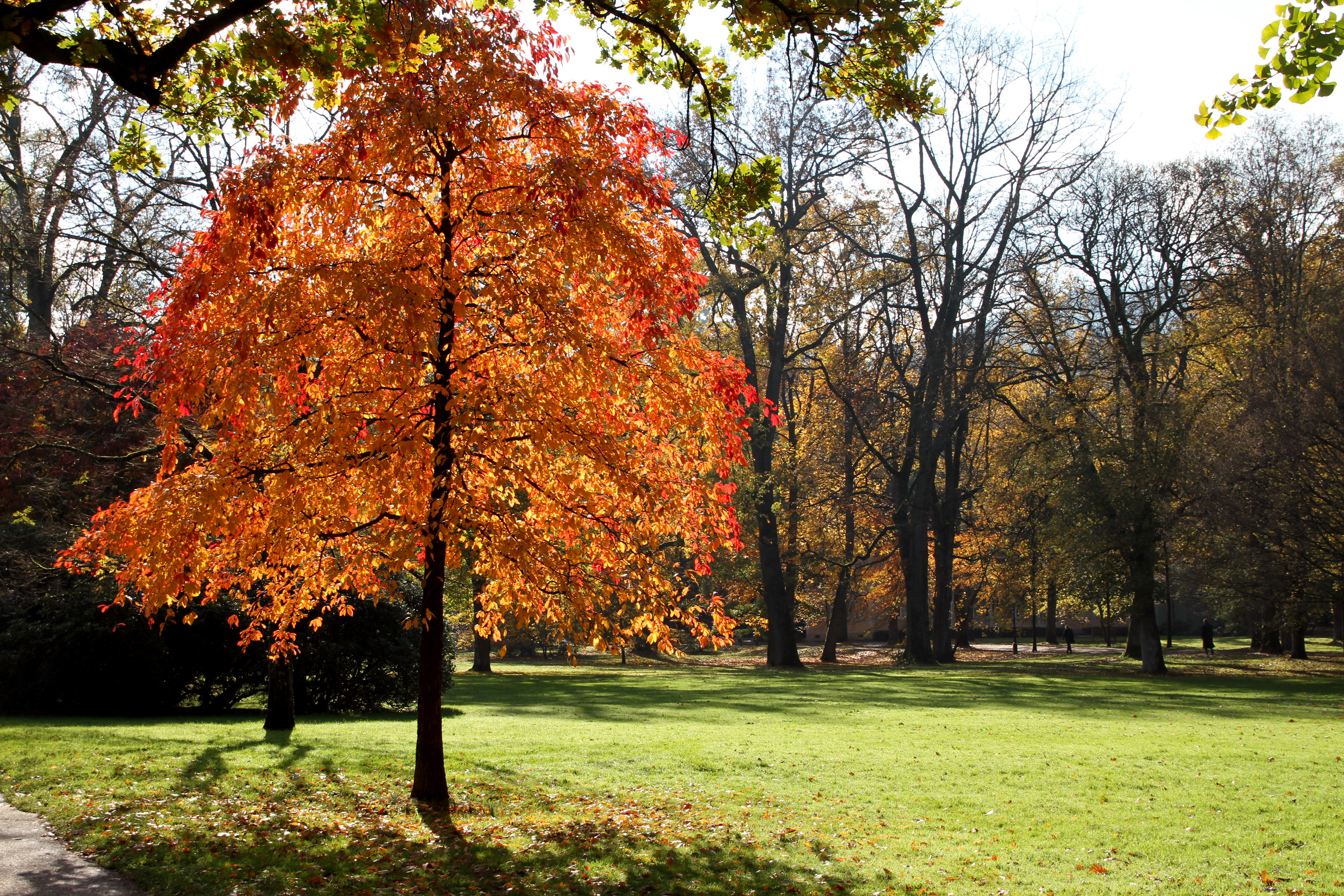
Nyssa sylvatica

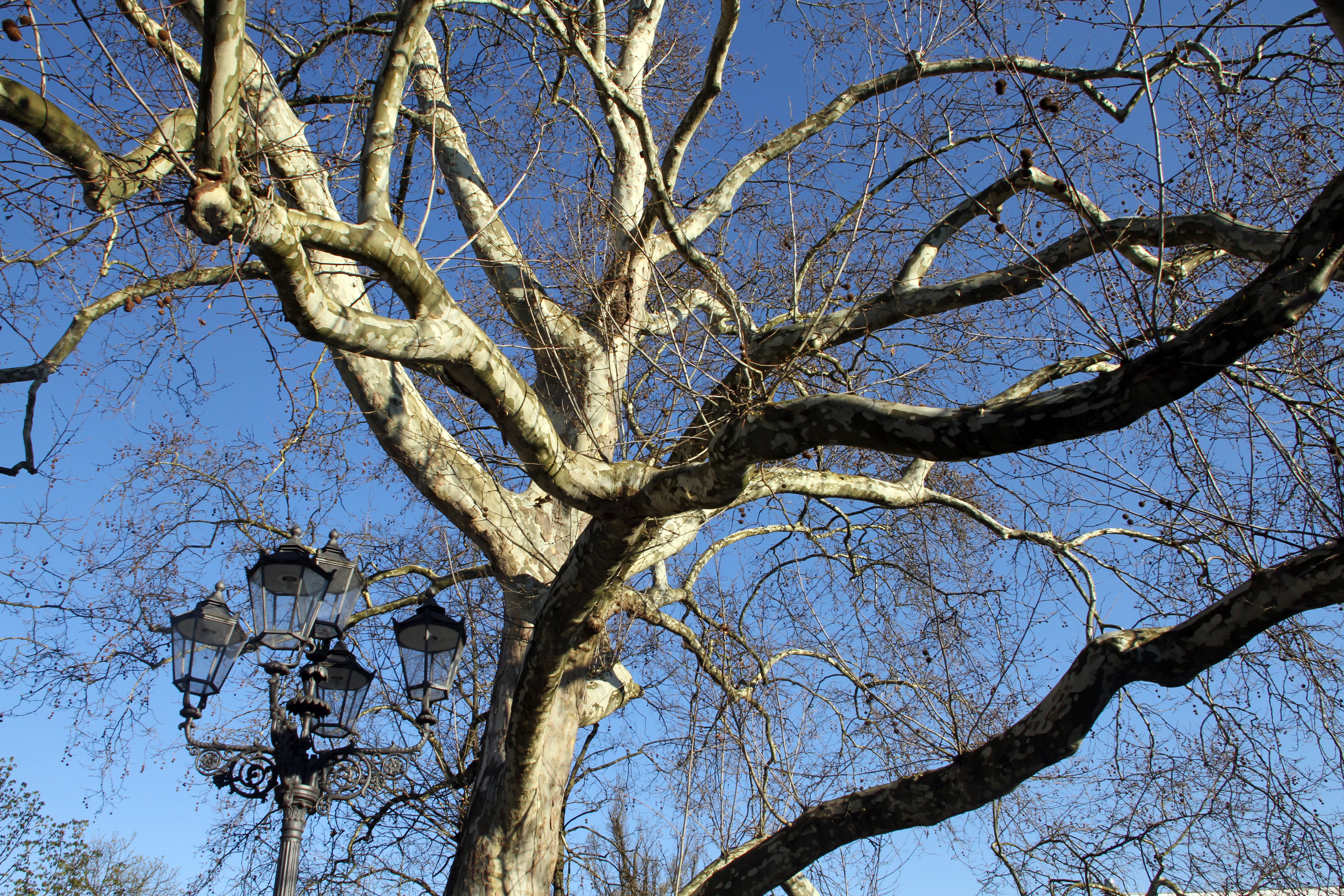
Sycamore

The avenue is said to have begun in 1655 as path between the town market and Lichtenthal monastery. It was developed from 1850 to 1870 at the instigation of the casino Bénazet, and planted with a wide variety of trees and woody plants. Today the avenue contains about 300 types of native and exotic woody plants, including alders, azaleas, chestnuts, ginkgos, limes, magnolias, maples, oaks, and sycamores. The avenue terminates at its northwest end in a kurgarten, and at the southeast in a dahlia garden containing busts of Clara Schumann, Johannes Brahms, and Robert Stolz.

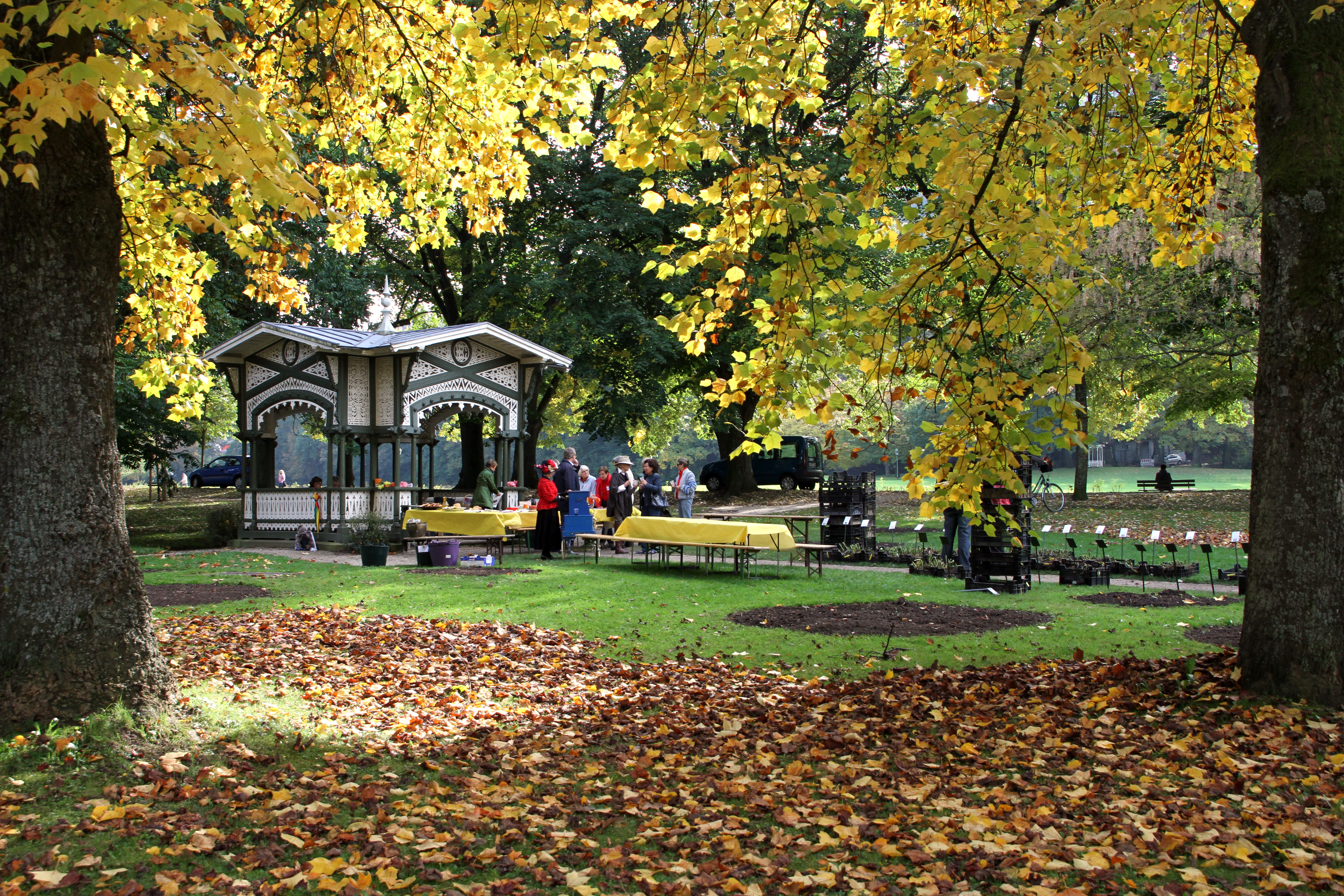
Pavillon Bénazet

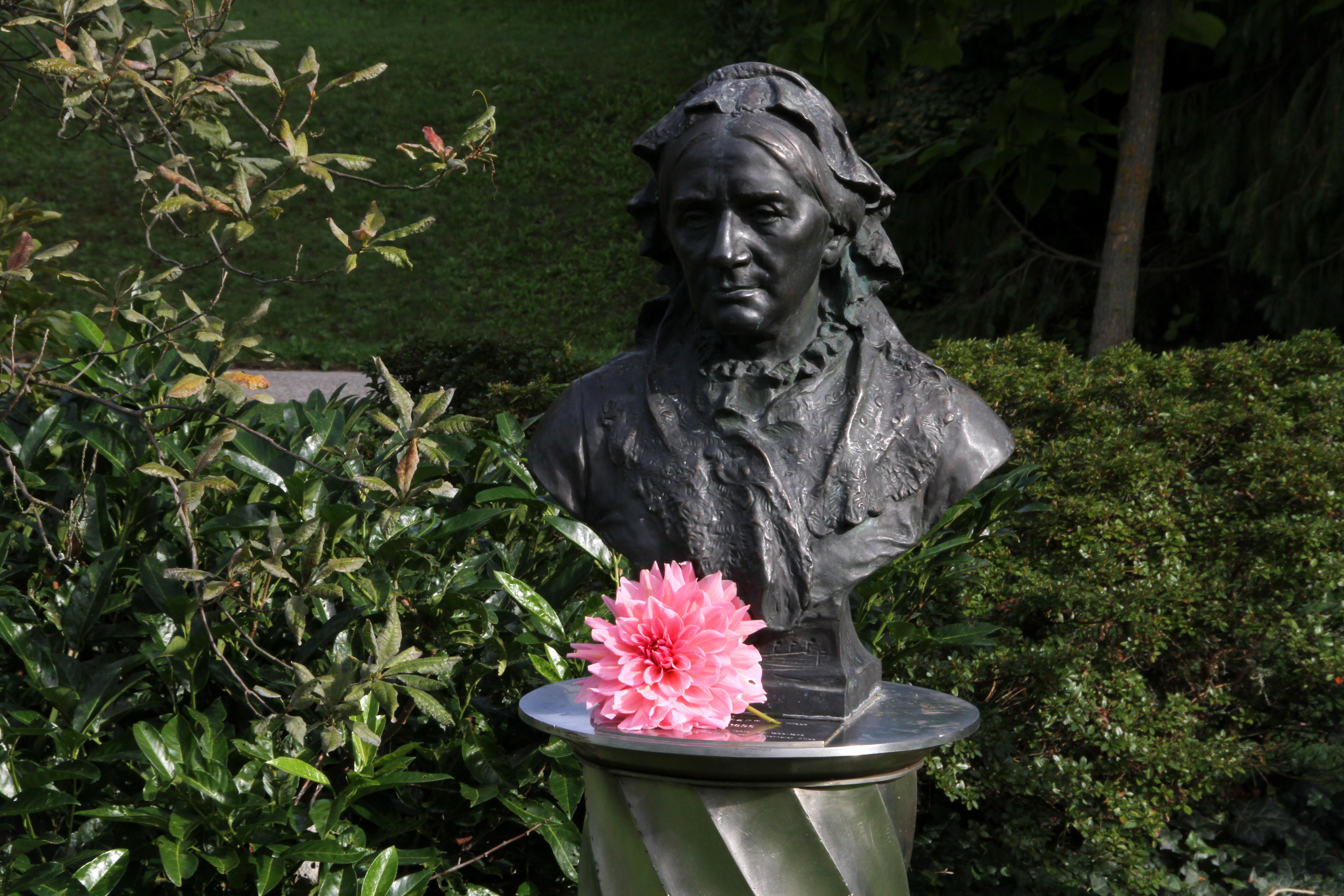
Clara Schumann

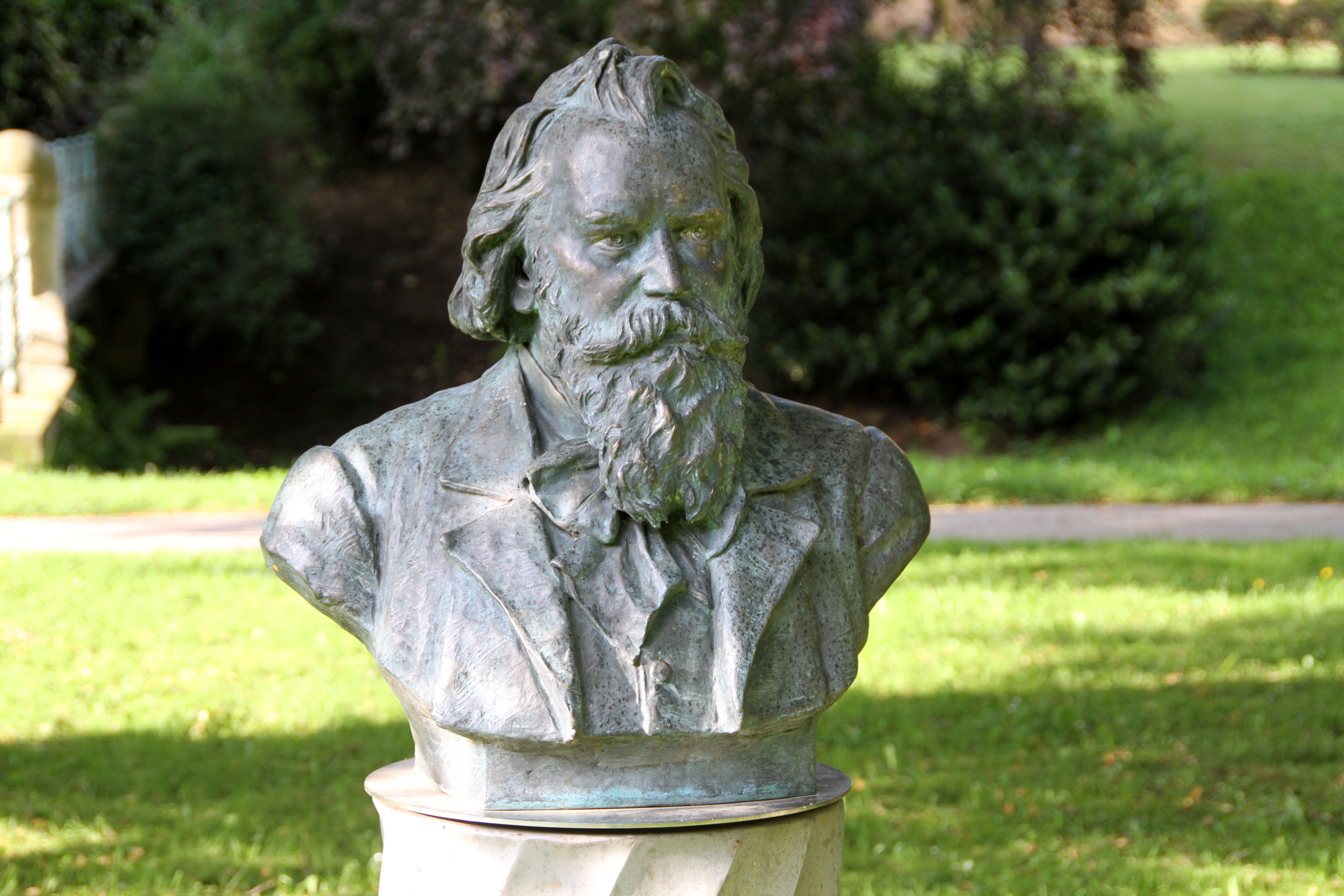
Johannes Brahms

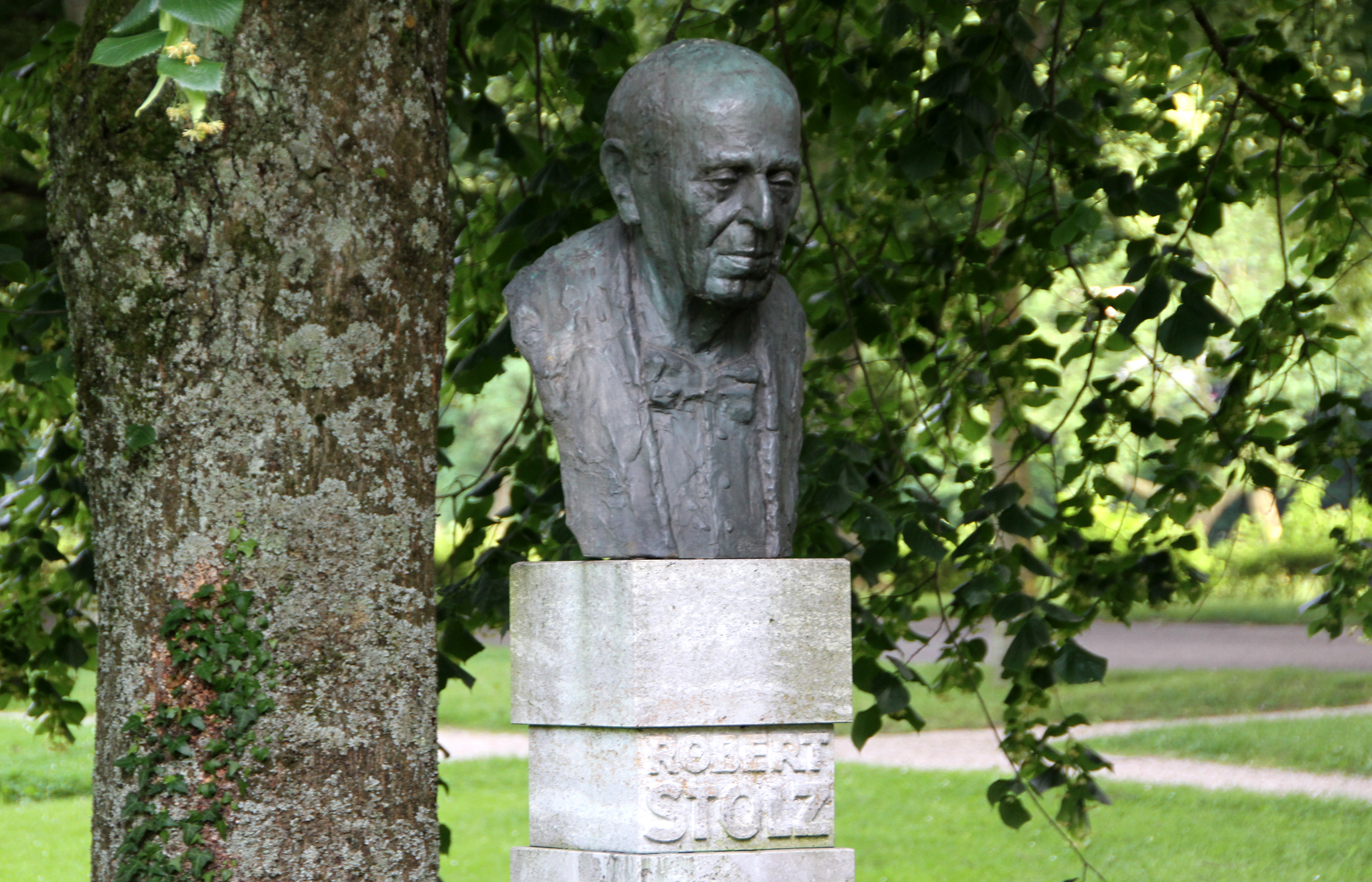
Robert Stolz

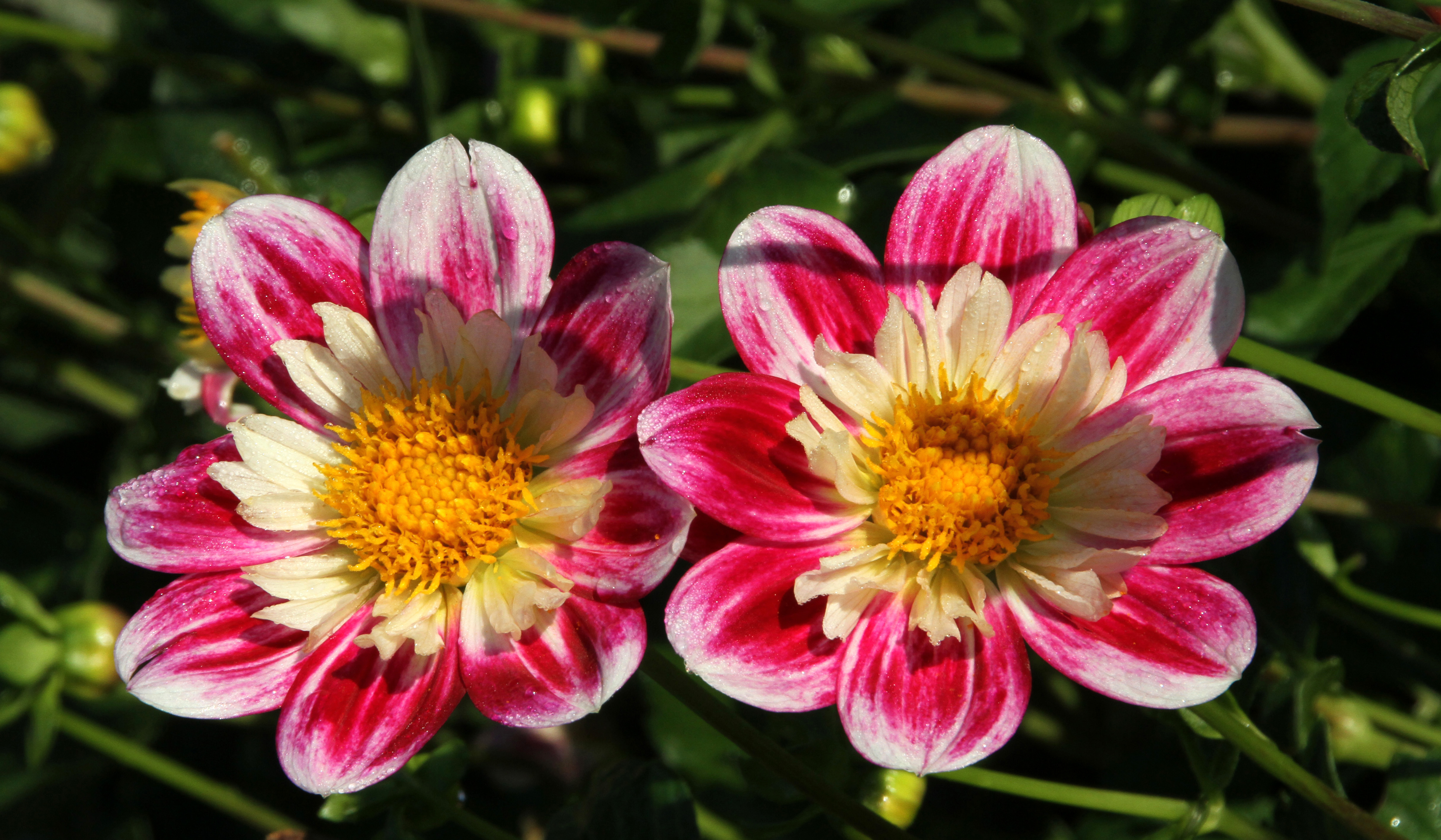
Dahlia

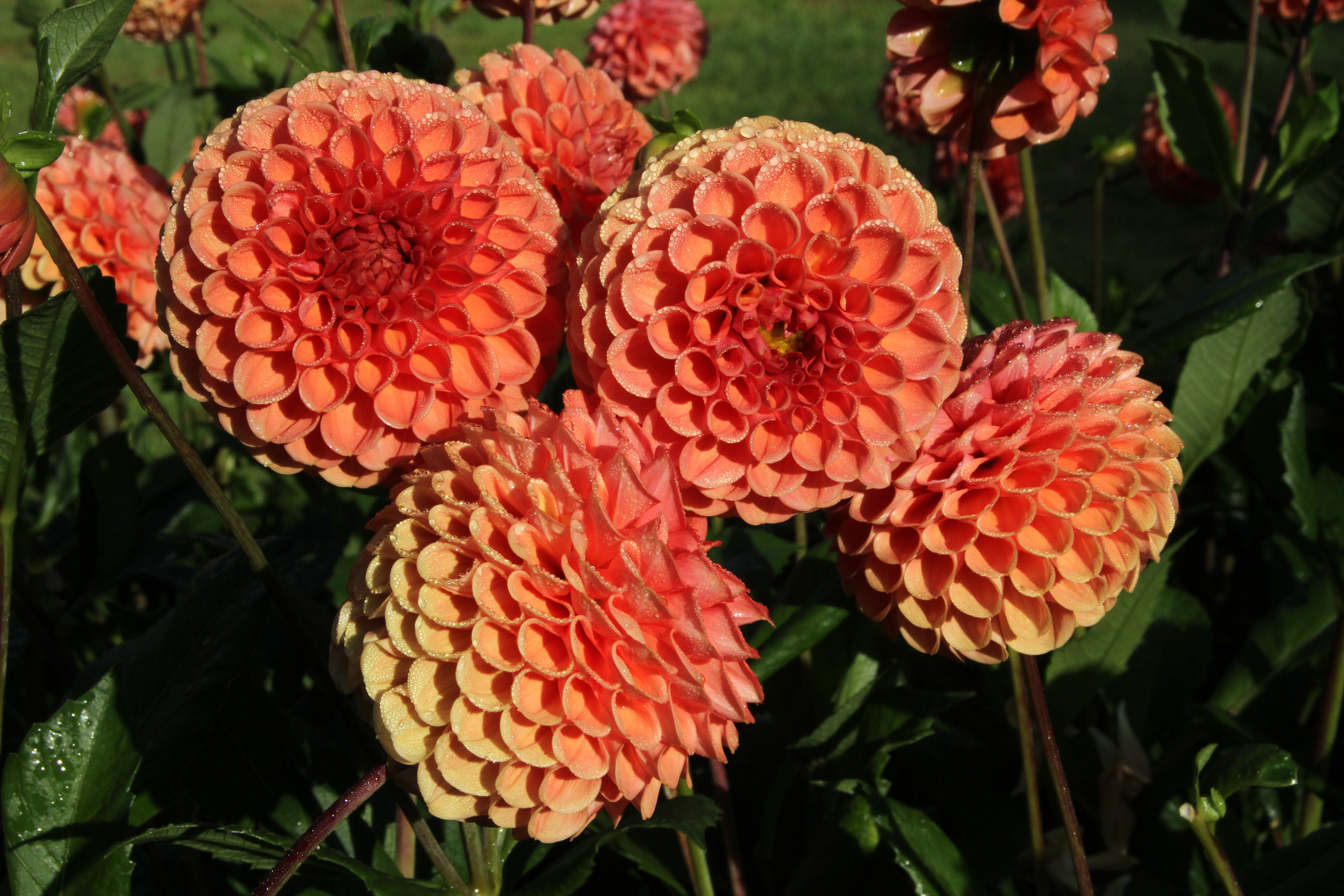
Dahlia

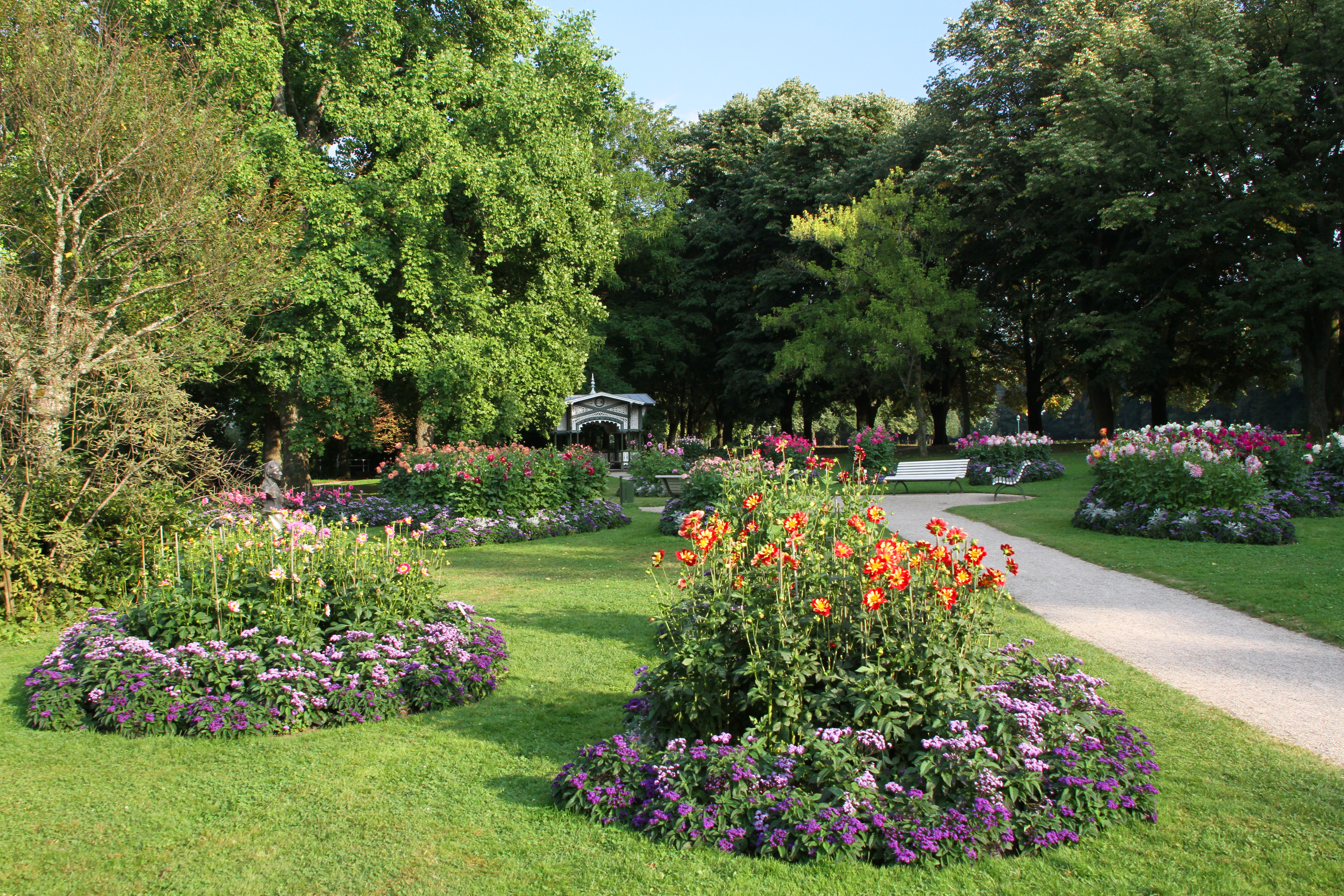
Dahlia garden

== See also ==
- List of botanical gardens in Germany
