= Thienen-Adlerflycht =

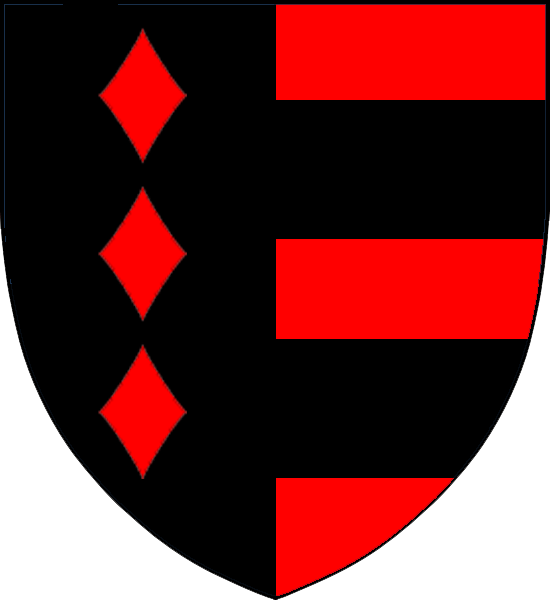
Coat of arms of the Thienen family

The Thienen family is the name of an ancient noble family, that origins in the Duchy of Holstein. The spelling of the name, over the centuries has changed from Tyne and Tynen to Thien, Tienen, Thinen and finally Thienen. The barons of Thienen-Adlerflycht are the only branch of this family still existing; they belong to the high nobility of Denmark.

== History ==
In his 1670 published work Insignia et tabula Genealogica dominorum a Thinen, the genealogist Johann Daniel Eberus describes that the family of Thienen was expelled from Holstein in the beginning of the 9th Century by Charlemagne. As a consequence, the family fled to Brabant (today's Belgium) and there founded the city Thienen or Tienen (French: Tirlemont). However, at least one branch of the family returned around 1000 AD and stayed in Dithmarschen until 1280, when they were expelled again. Some members of the family fought against the people of Dithmarschen as knights in 1289, 1322 and 1404.

The first completely provable documentation of the family is the Knight Heneke of Thienen, born in 1270, in 1314. The barons of Thienen-Adlerflycht are among the nine extant Equites Originarii, the ancient noble families (Uradel) of Schleswig-Holstein.

Today's head of the family is Franz Baron of Thienen-Adlerflycht (born 1957).

=== Two important manor houses built by the Thienen family ===
Various castles and manor houses were built by the Thienen family over the last centuries, the following two are from special cultural importance.

The former moated castle Wahlstorf was built in the 15th century by Detlev of Thienen and his son Claus. It is one of the oldest still existing manor houses of Schleswig-Holstein. After more than 320 years in family ownership, in 1788 the Plessen family inherited it.

The castle of Güldenstein has been built in 1726 by Heinrich of Thienen. The moated castle is located on an oval island, it is well known as a main example of baroque architecture in Schleswig-Holstein. It is owned by the dukes of Oldenburg since 1839.

=== Barons of Thienen-Adlerflycht ===
The only still existing branch of the family received the title of Danish barons in 1840 (as Barons of Thienen-Adlerflycht). The connection of the names Thienen and Adlerflycht arose due to the marriage of Conrad Christoph of Thienen with Luise of Adlerflycht, the last, of an ancient noble family that originated from Sweden. Conrad Christoph and Luise emigrated from Schleswig-Holstein. Their son Karl baron of Thienen-Adlerflycht was the diplomatic representative of the Danish king and several German principalities and duchies in Vienna. Since then the barons of Thienen-Adlerflycht live in Austria.

== Representatives of the family ==
- Johann of Thienen, born in 1342, Steward
- Beata of Thienen, born in 1368, married to Erik of Krummedike, great-grandmother of the Swedish king, Gustav I.
- Detlev of Thienen, born in 1440, built the Castle Wahlstorf
- Otto of Thienen, born in 1514, Steward
- Brigitta of Thienen was 1570-1576 prioress of the Monastery of Preetz
- Kai of Thienen, born in 1675 Steward
- Hans of Thienen, born in 1686 Reichshofrat, imperial Chamberlain, since 1738 dean of the cathedral chapters in Bishopric of Lübeck
- Wulf-Heinrich of Thienen, born in 1736, Danish General and Steward
- Klaus Christoph of Thienen, born in 1754, royal Danish General and Chamberlain
- Conrad Christoph baron of Thienen-Adlerflycht, born in 1804, died in 1884, Chamberlain, legation secretary
- Karl baron of Thienen-Adlerflycht, born in 1835, diplomatic representatives of the Danish king and German principalities in Vienna.
- Conrad Christoph baron of Thienen-Adlerflycht, born in 1924, died in 2010, historian
- Wolfgang baron of Thienen-Adlerflycht, born in 1951, died in 2007, priest, Guardian and vicar provincial in the Order of Friars Minor Capuchin

== Castles and manor houses that were in the Thienen-Adlerflycht family's possession ==
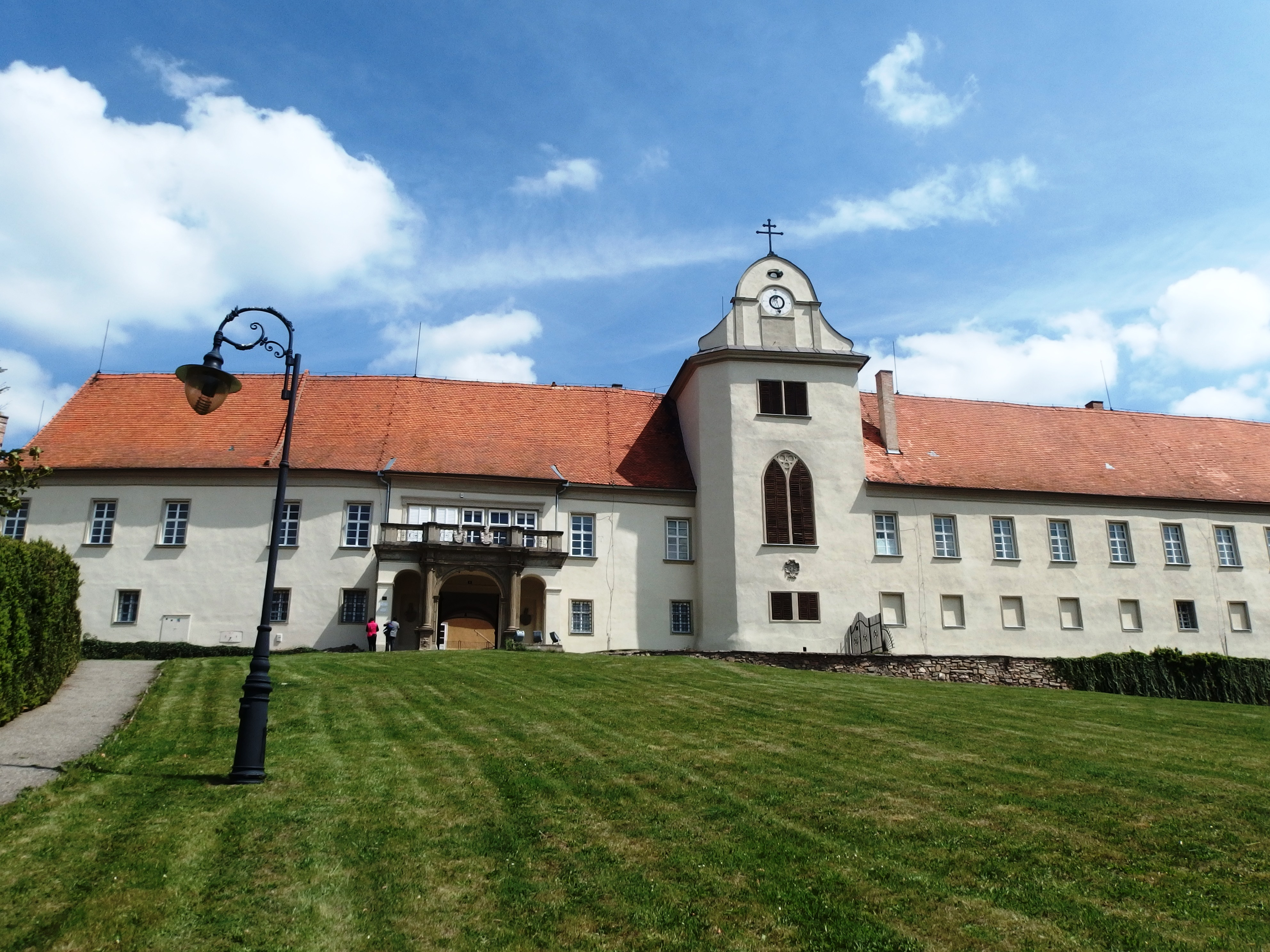
Lomnice Castle

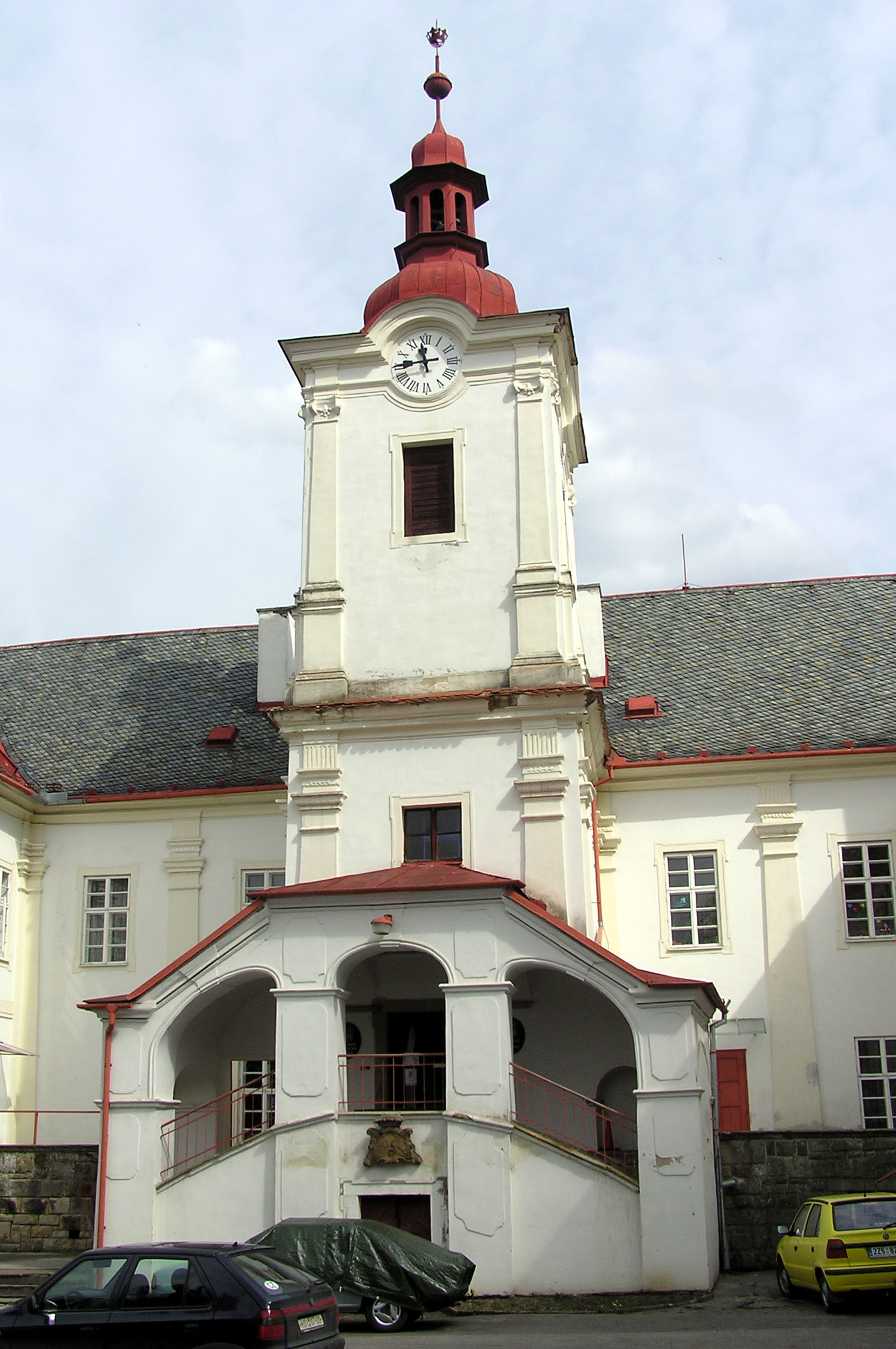
Luhačovice Castle

=== Schleswig-Holstein and Denmark ===
Ahretost, Gut-Augustenhof, Bienebek, Borghorst, Bülk, Bundhorst, Cronsburg, Eckhof, Ellgaard, Griesgaard, Goddersdorf, Grünholz, Klein-Grünholz, Großenbrode, Großnordsee, Güldenstein, Harzhoff, Klausdorf, Kühren, Löhrstorff, Maasleben, Marienhof, Mehlbek, Mirebüll, Nehmten, Palais Thienen in Kiel, Petersdorf, Rathmannsdorf, Rethwisch (now part of Schönwalde am Bungsberg), Schinkel, Sierhagen, Thienenhof / Prinzeßhof, Tollgaard, Tollschlag (Nieharde), Travenort, Gut Wahlstorf, Warleberg, Warleberger Hof, Gut Wensin, Wippendorf (Kappeler Harde), Gut Wittmoldt, Wulfshagen, Wulfshagenerhütten, and the Thienenhaus at the Monastery of Preetz

=== Austria ===
Neuhaus Castle in Salzburg, Katzenberg Castle in Upper Austria

=== Czech Republic ===
Today the family owns the castles in Lomnice near Brno and Luhačovice in the Zlín Region.

=== Russia ===
Jurkino, Litkino, Sinzoro, Kislorka, Kriuscha, Marina

== Bibliography ==
- Johann Daniel Eberus, „Insignia et tabula genealogica dominorum a Thinen“ published 1670
- Prof. publ. Kilon. Adam Hinrich Lackman und prof. Hafn. Claus Heinrich Moller, „Beschreibung der in den Herzogthümern Schleswig-Holstein angessenen ritterlichen Familie von Thienen ....“ published around 1750
- Freiherr Waldemar Weber von Rosenkrantz, „Die Familie von Thienen“
- Genealogisches Handbuch des Adels, Freiherrliche Häuser A, Band III (1959) und Band XI (1979); Freiherrliche Häuser Band XVIII (1995), C. A. Starke Verlag
- Genealogisches Handbuch des Adels, Adelslexikon Band XIV, Band 131 der Gesamtreihe, C. A. Starke Verlag, Limburg (Lahn) 2003, ISSN 0435-2408
- Danmarks Adels Aarbog, 1935 (Gesamtgenealogie)
- Gothaischen Genealogischen Freiherrlichen Taschenbücher 1890 until 1940
