= Otto Flake =

German writer

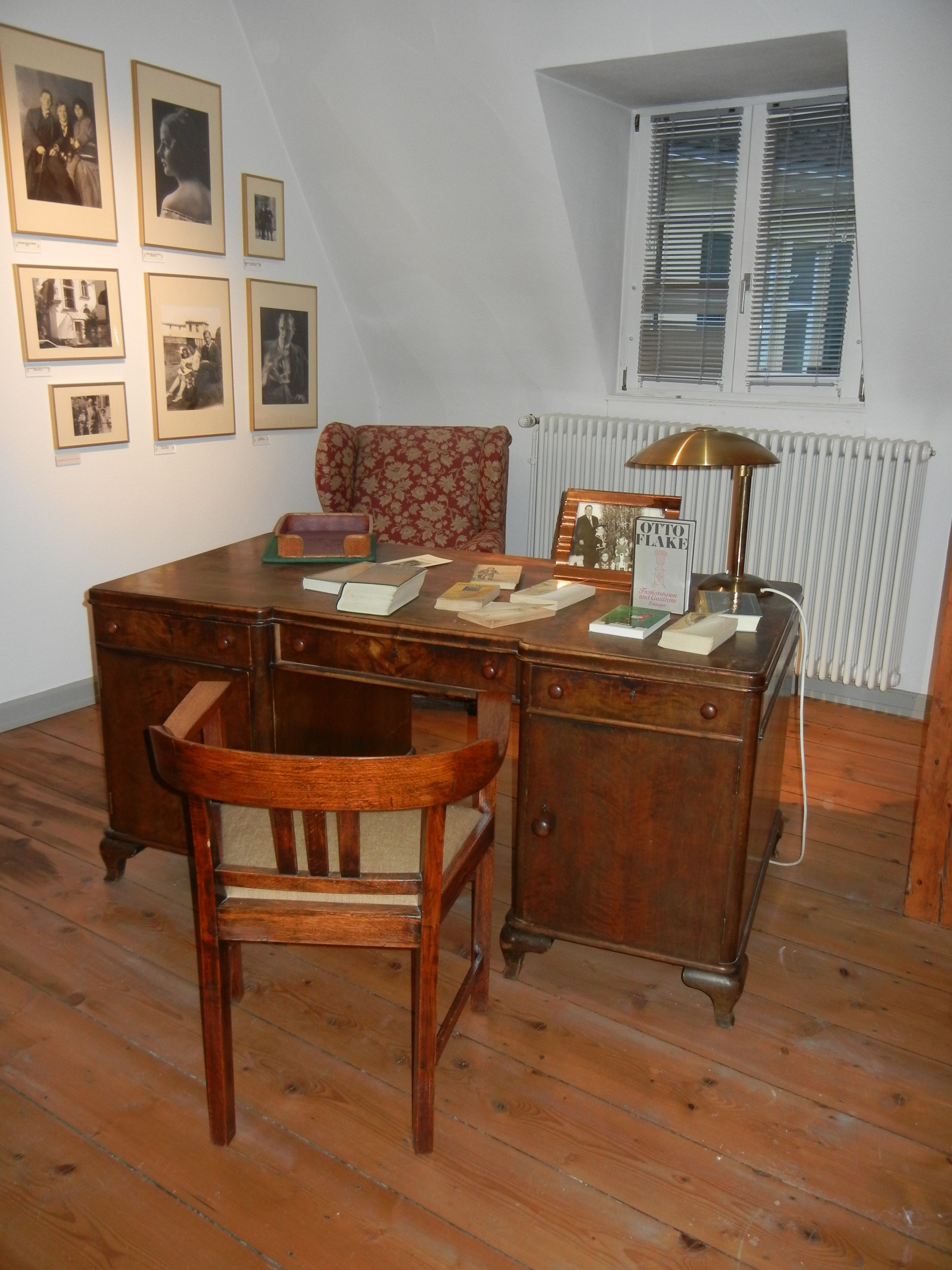
Flake's desk in the Literaturmuseum Baden-Baden

Otto Flake (29 October 1880, Metz – 10 November 1963) was a German writer.

== Early life ==
Flake was born on 29 October 1880 in Metz. He attended high school in Colmar and studied German philology, philosophy and art history at the University of Strasbourg.

== Career ==
Flake has an extensive œuvre that includes two volumes of fairy tales that rework traditional folk-tale characters and beliefs.

== In popular culture ==
Flake's name was used as a pseudonym by British journalist, critic, and music promoter Paul Morley in the used mid-1980s. Most notably Morley wrote as Flake to criticise his former collaborators in music project Art of Noise, following their departure from his record label ZTT Records. Morley perceived that the core members had departed from the original experimental intent of the project. The critique was contained in a liner-note essay for the 1986 compilation album Daft by Art of Noise, published on ZTT Records. Writing as "Otto Flake", Morley adopted a deliberately ornate, ironic, and pseudo-academic style that parodied intellectual seriousness while also reflecting on pop culture’s self-conscious artifice.

Morley has never publicly stated why he chose Flake's name.

Midge Ure used the pseudonym "Otto Flake Jr." when he produced the single "When Your Heart Runs Out Of Time" by Glenn Gregory and Claudia Brücken, which released on ZTT in 1985.

== Personal life ==
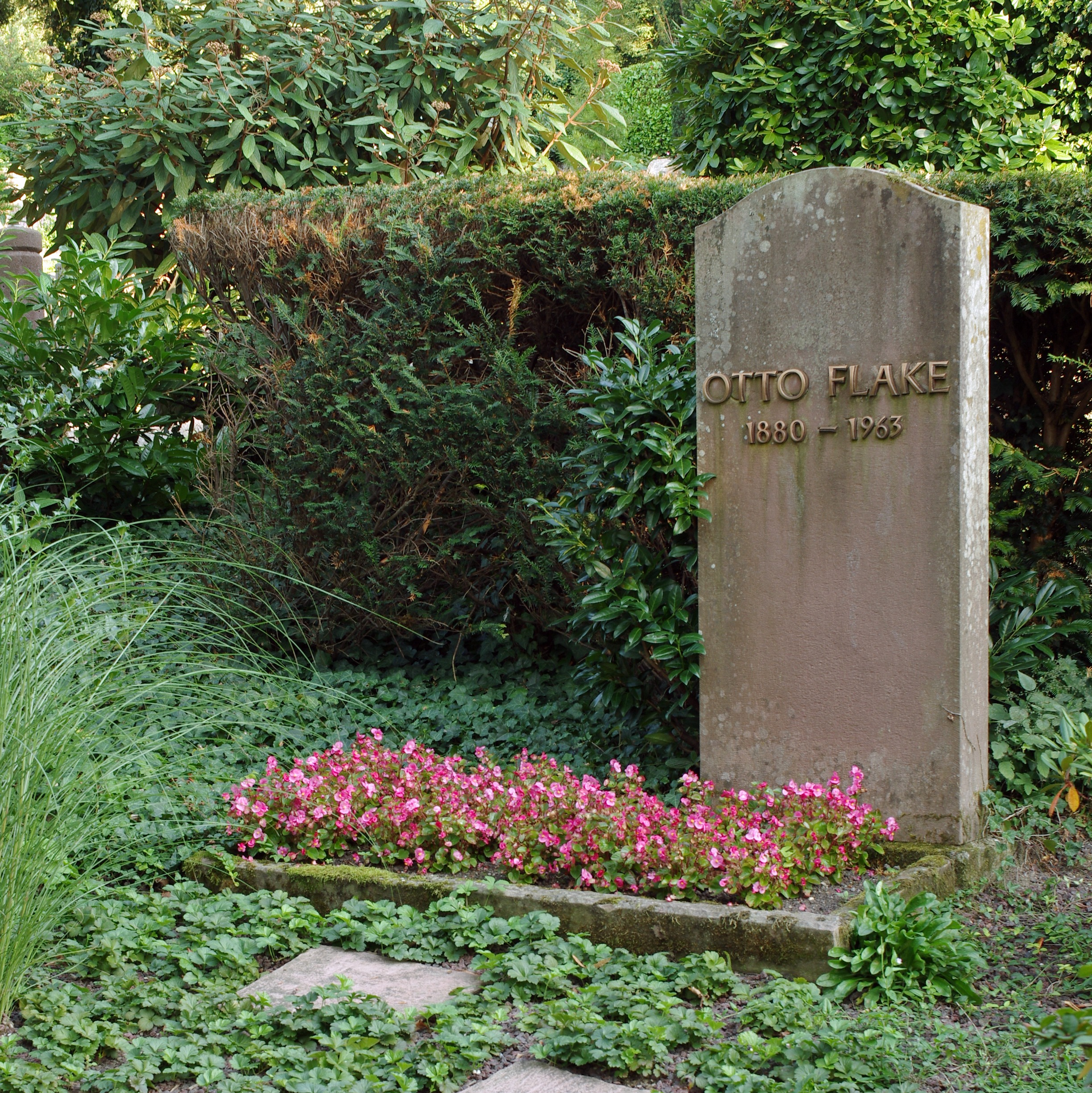
Flake's grave site in Baden-Baden.

Flake was married five times, including to German doctor and socialist Minna Flake, with whom he had a son, Thomas Flake, who was born in 1908, and twice to the mother of his daughter, Eva Maria (née Flake in 1921) Seveno.

He died on 10 November 1963 in Baden-Baden, where he was buried.
