= Franz Nölken =

German painter (1884–1918)

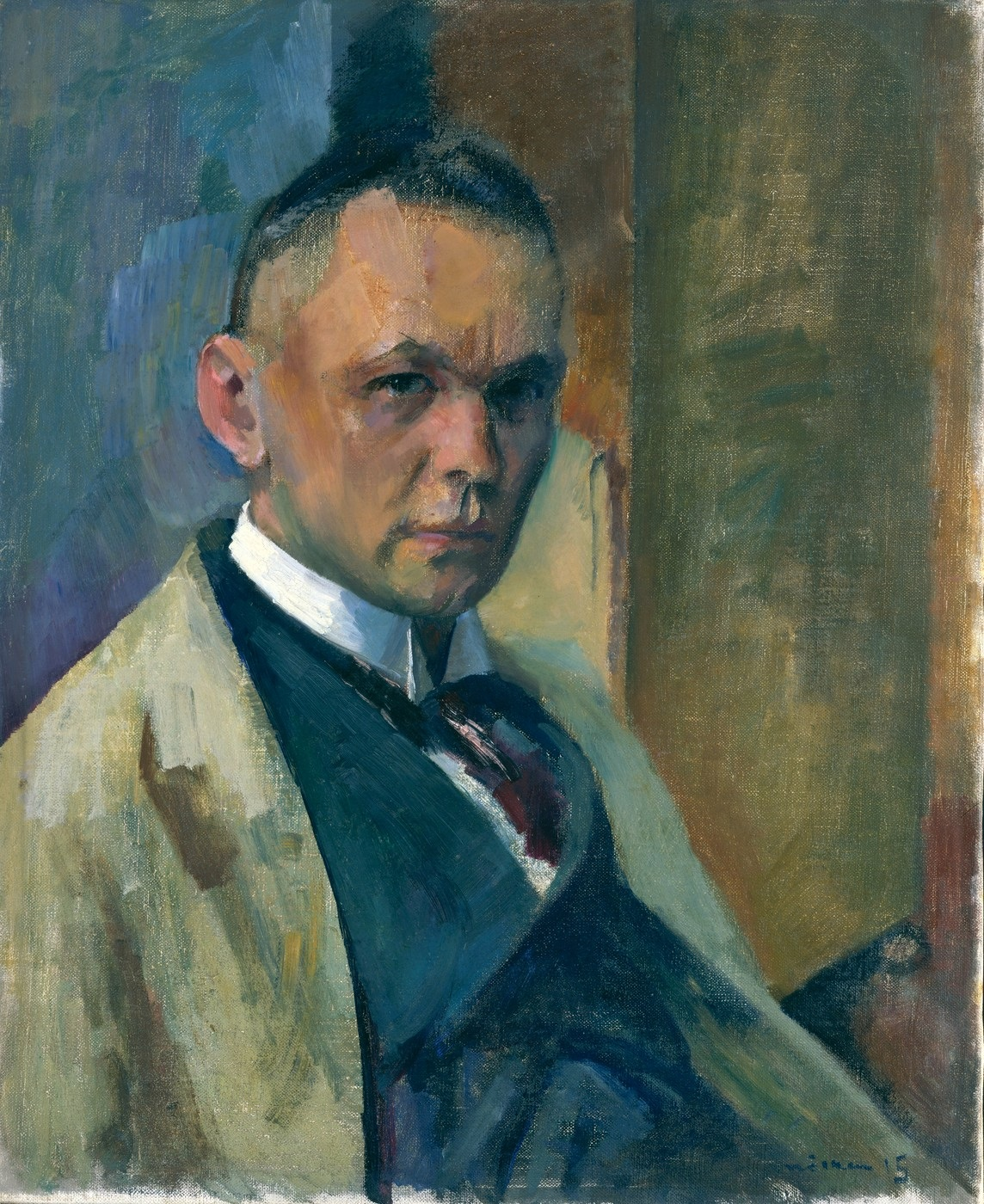
Self-portrait (1915)

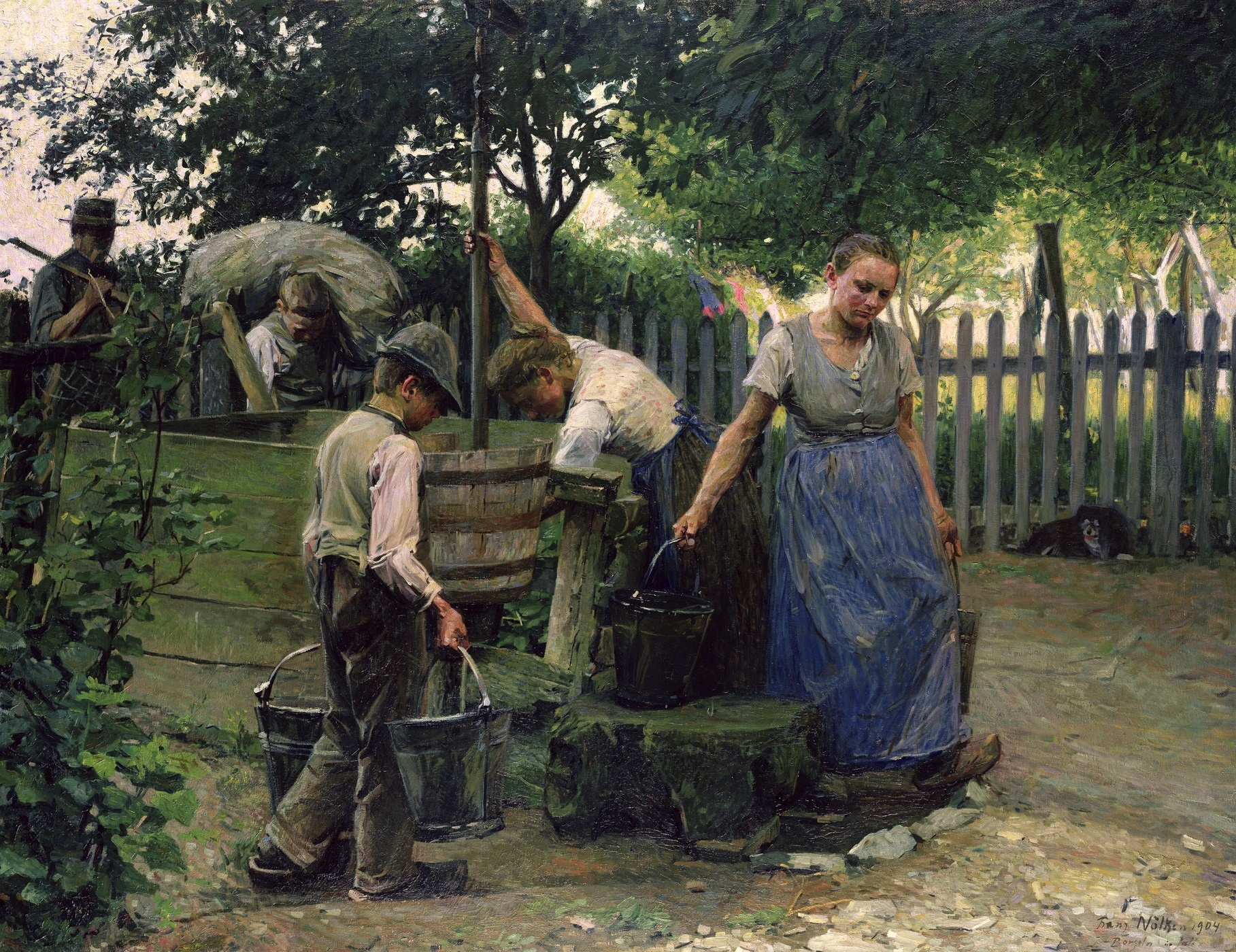
'At the Fountain', c. 1905 – one of his first exhibited works

Franz Nölken (born 5 May 1884 – died 4 November 1918) was a German Expressionist painter; occasionally associated with Die Brücke, an artists' society in Dresden.

== Biography ==
Franz Noelken was born 5 May, 1884 in Hamburg. At the age of sixteen, he began attending the Johanneum, a liberal arts gymnasium. On the advice of Alfred Lichtwark, the Director of the Hamburger Kunsthalle, he took classes from Arthur Siebelist, who eschewed the Academic approach and took his students to paint en plein aire.

He joined the Hamburgischer Künstlerklub in 1903 and, the following year, had his first exhibition at the prestigious Galerie Commeter with fellow students Friedrich Ahlers-Hestermann, Fritz Friedrichs, Walter Alfred Rosam and Walter Voltmer. He undertook a study trip to his birthplace, near Soest, in 1905, where he met the businessman, Ernst Rump, a supporter of the arts who would later become his patron. Together with Ahlers-Hestermann and Rosam, he went to Paris in 1907 and mingled with the artists at Le Dôme Café.

In 1908, at the invitation of Karl Schmidt-Rottluff, he joined Die Brücke and exhibited with them in 1909 and 1910. He resigned in 1912, but would return later. Meanwhile, in 1909, he made another trip to Paris, where he studied with Henri Matisse at his short-lived Académie. Upon returning from Paris, he took Anita Rée as a student and, together with Ahlers-Hestermann, created a studio. The arrangement was brief, as Rée apparently fell in love with Nölken and her affections were not returned.

He became a teacher at a private art school for women in 1912. He also made friends with the composer, Max Reger (Nölken was an excellent amateur pianist), and painted numerous portraits of him, one of which was purchased by one of Nölken's patrons, Oskar Troplowitz, to hang in his billiard room. In 1914, he made another trip to Paris.

He almost avoided service in World War I, but was drafted in 1917 and killed a week before the war ended, near La Capelle on the Belgian border. Two streets are named after him, in the Barmbek district of Hamburg and in Soest.

== Selected paintings ==
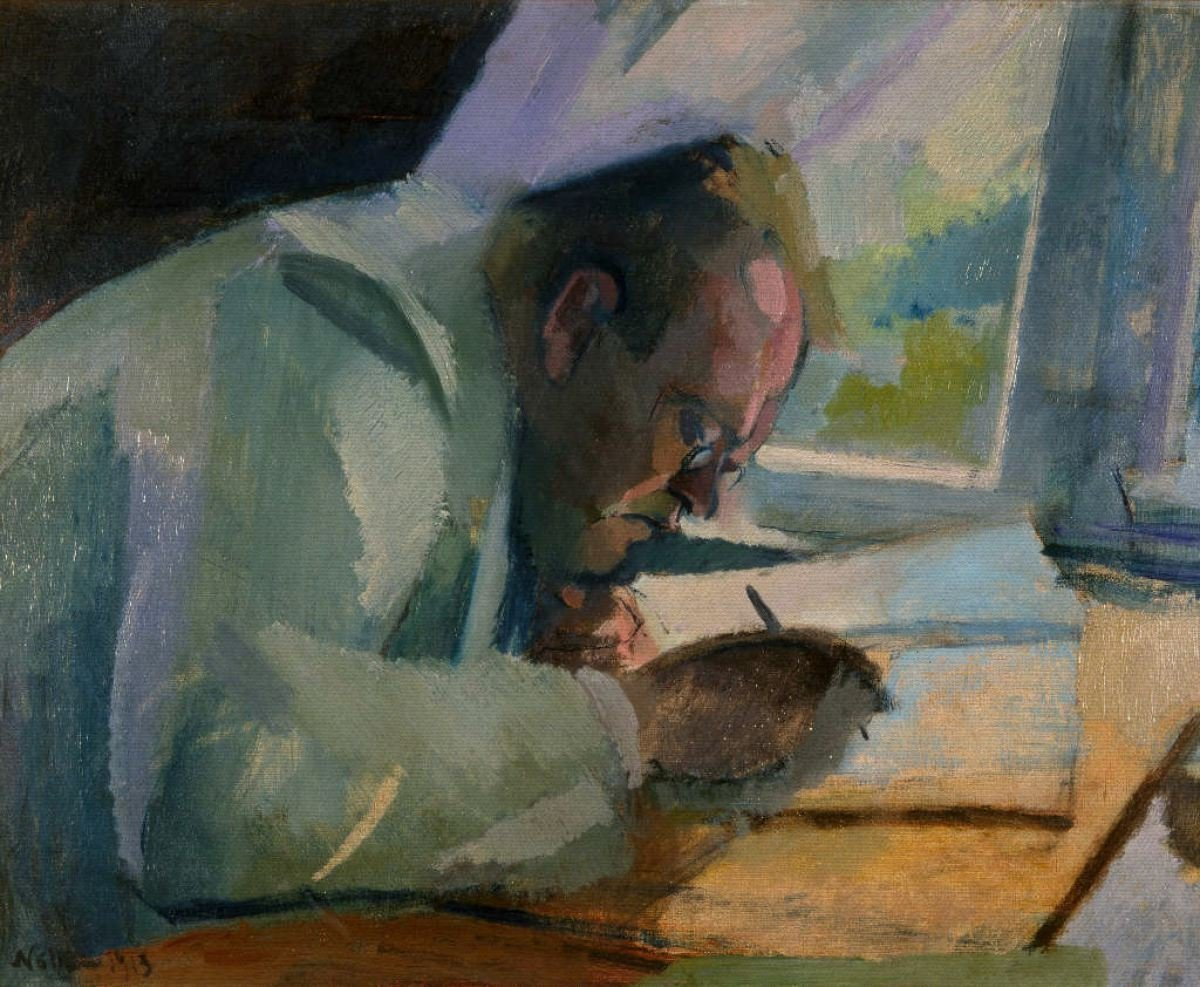
Max Reger at work

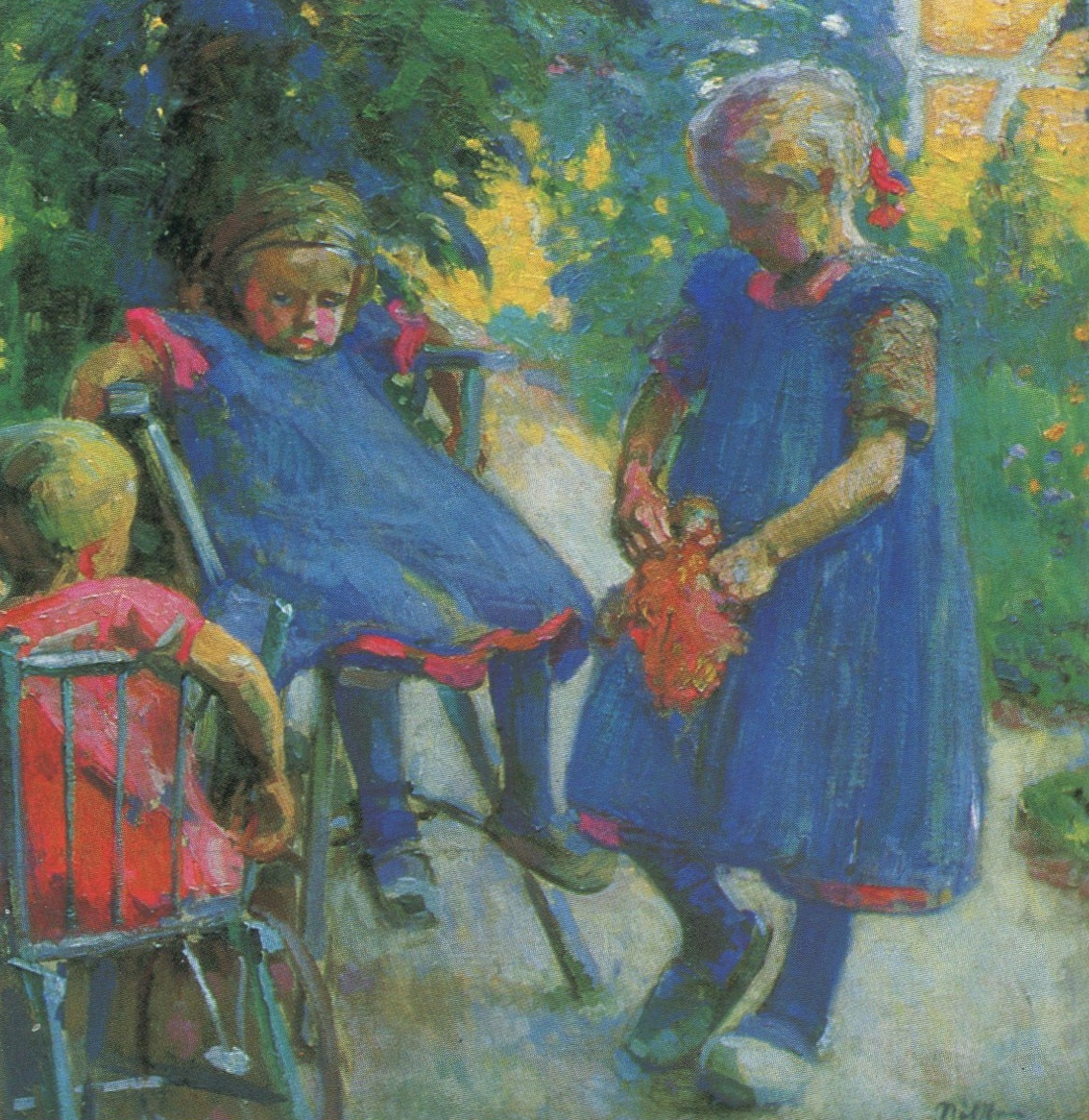
Kindergarten

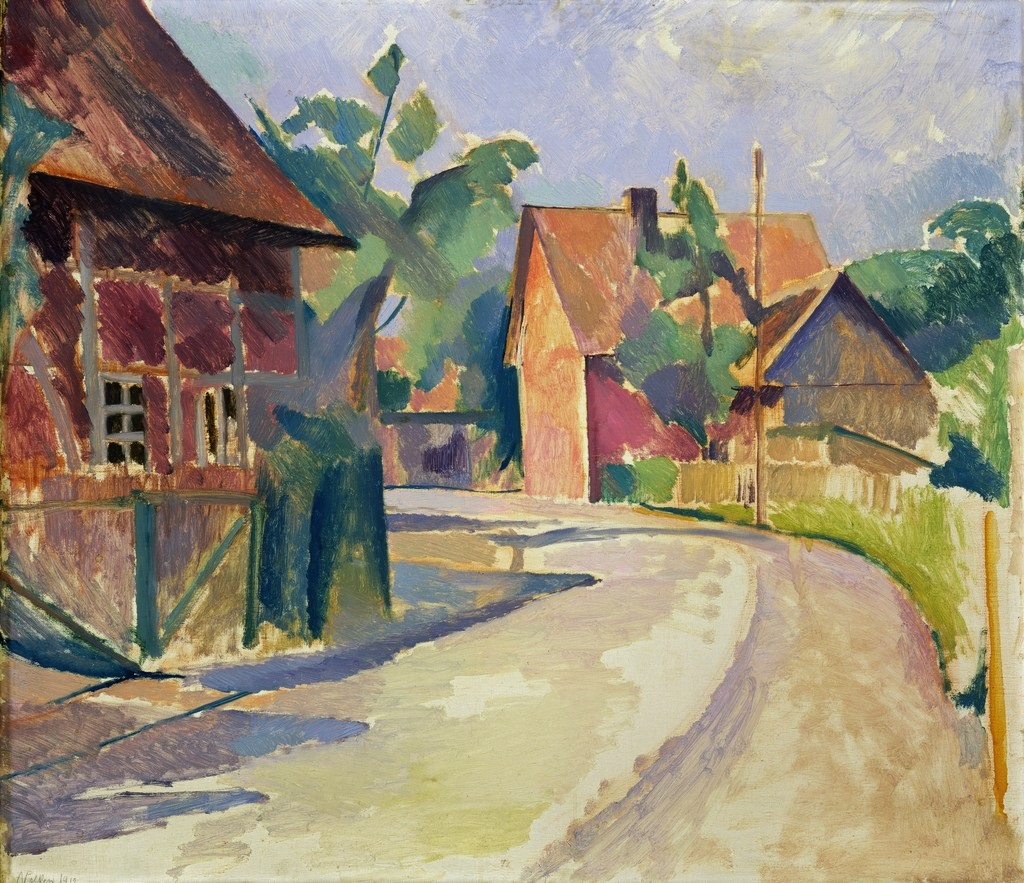
Village Street

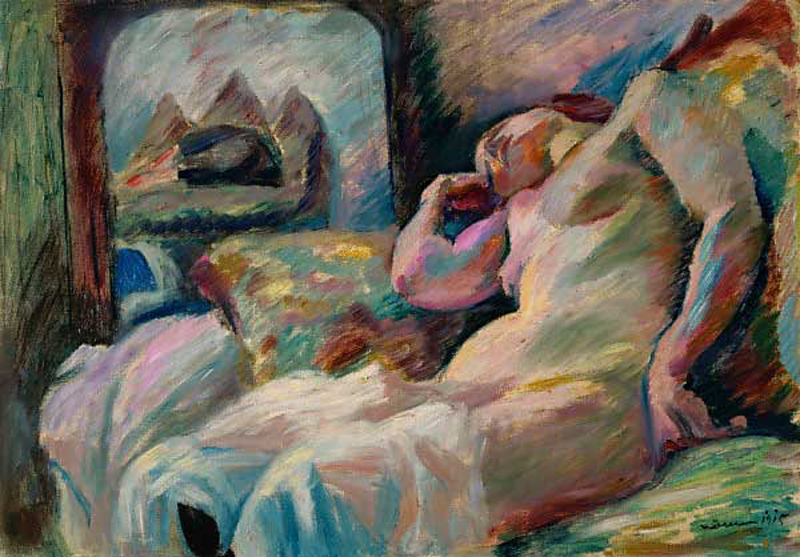
Sleeping Female Nude
by a Mirror

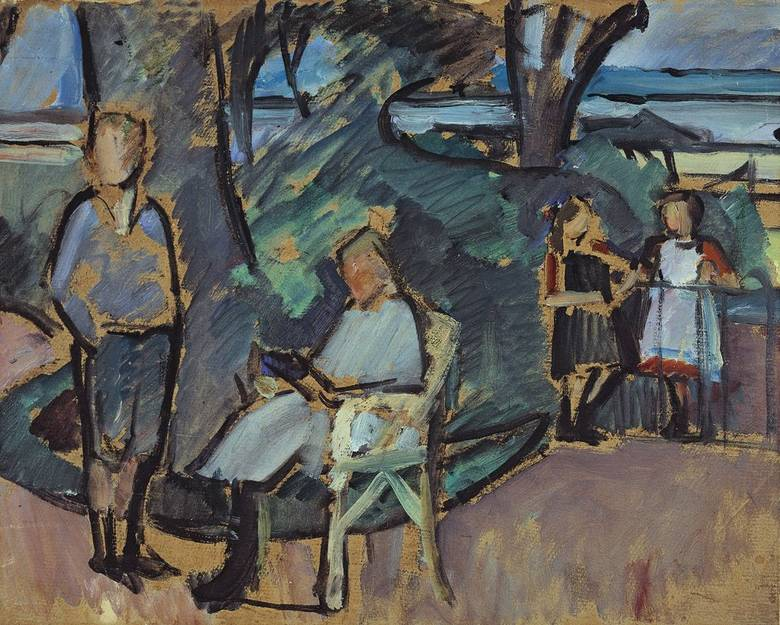
Group of Children in the Park
