= Peter Alfred Schou =

Danish painter

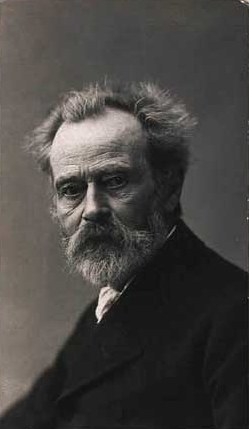
P.A. Schou (late 1900s)

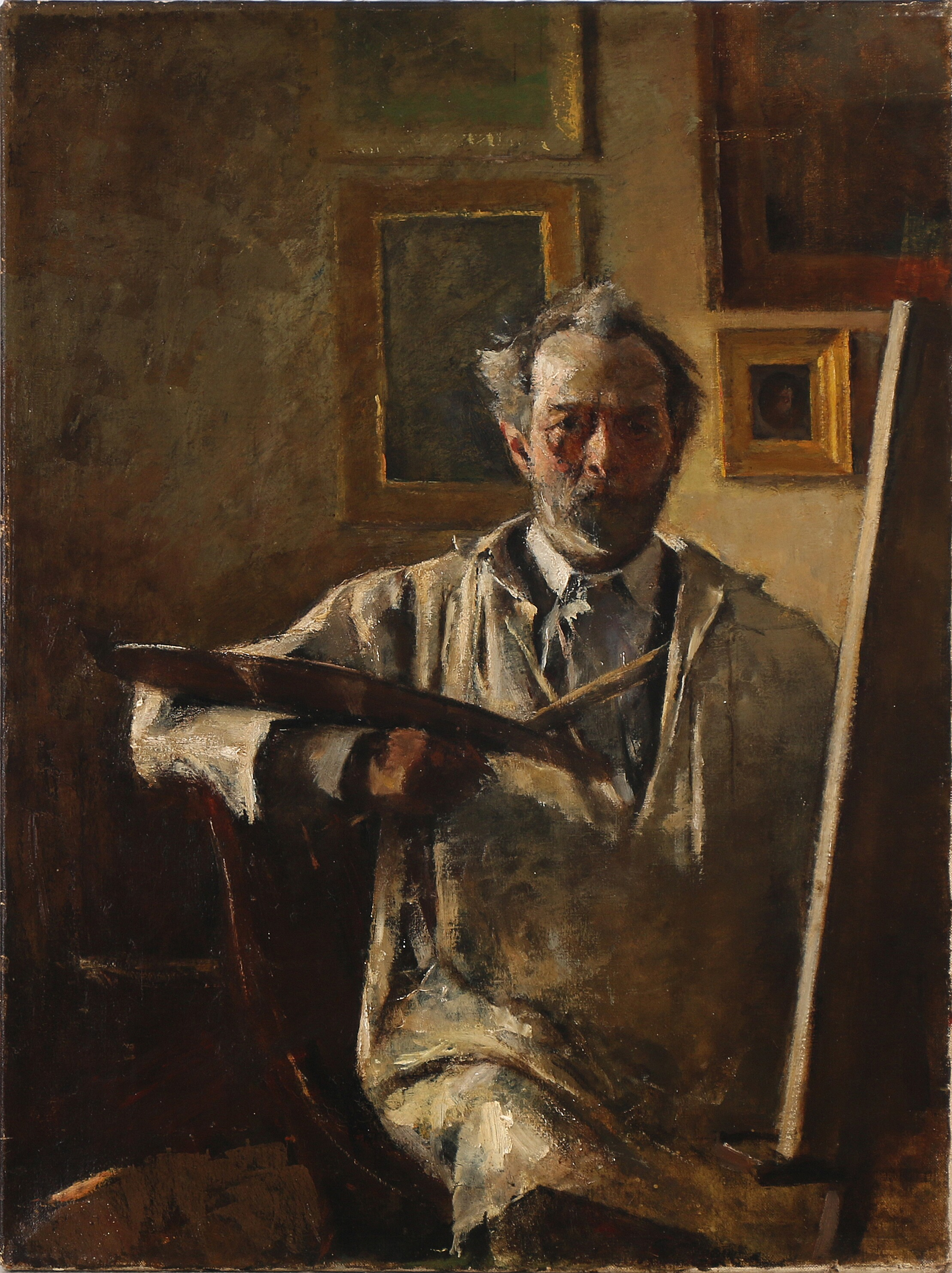
P.A. Schou self portrait (1900)

Peter Alfred Schou (known as P.A. Schou; 8 October 1844 – 21 November 1914) was a Danish painter.

== Biography ==
He was born at Copenhagen to a family of merchants from Slagelse shortly after their arrival in Copenhagen. He was the brother of Ludvig Abelin Schou. Originally, he chose to follow his father into business and attended a trade school. From 1865, he looked after his family's interests in Hamburg but, possibly inspired by his older brother's death in 1867, he began to spend his summers attending classes at the Dresden Academy of Fine Arts.

In 1876 he went to Paris, where he studied with Léon Bonnat. His first exhibition at the Salon came in 1880. The following year, a work of his was rejected by the censorship committee for the Charlottenborg Spring Exhibition and he went back to Hamburg.

As a result of his experience at Charlottenborg, he established the "Aktclub", a venue where artists could paint nude models without academic constraints. Among those who worked there were Arthur Siebelist, Julius von Ehren and Julius Wohlers. He returned to Denmark in 1902 and was a regular participant in several annual exhibitions after that time.

His paintings were mostly very simple; interiors with one or two figures in a dark, Post-Impressionist style. Many capture sad moments. The bedside of a tubercular young man is a recurring theme. He also painted some portraits and still-lifes.

In 1911, he was awarded the Anckers Scholarship (Det anckerske Legat) grant for composers, writers and artists. In 1908 and 1912, he received the Eckersberg Medal. He died at Frederiksberg and was buried in Solbjerg Park Cemetery.

== Selected paintings ==
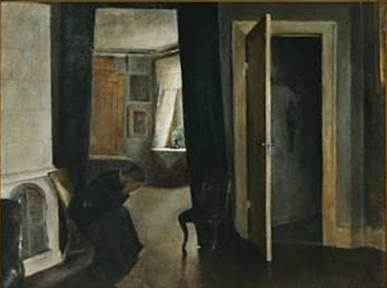
Left Behind
(1899)

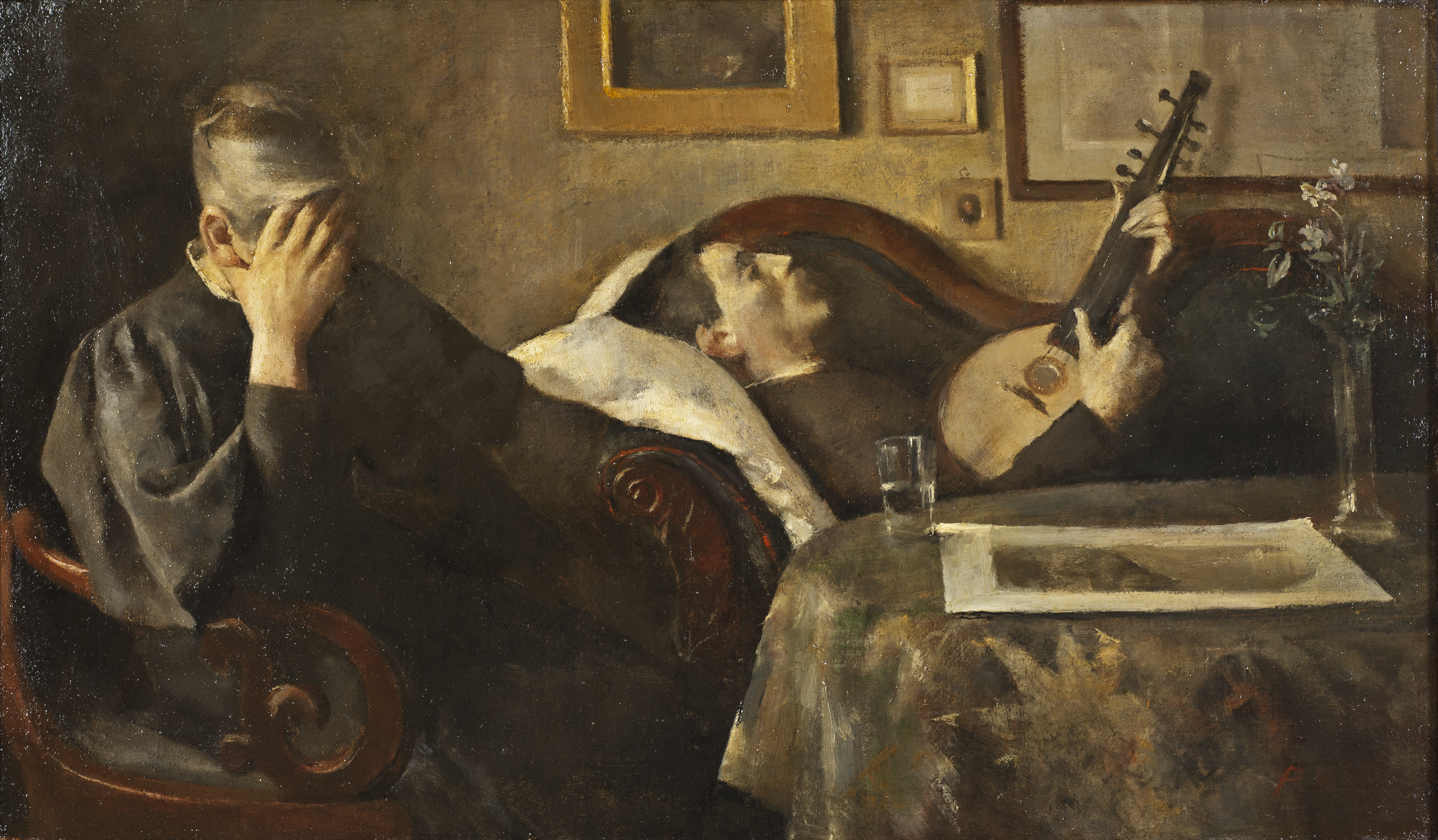
Gravity. Interior
(1890)

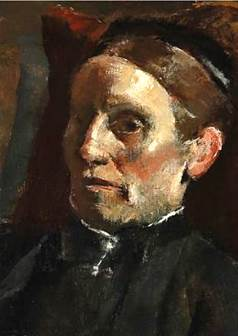
Artist's Sister, Ida
(before 1914)

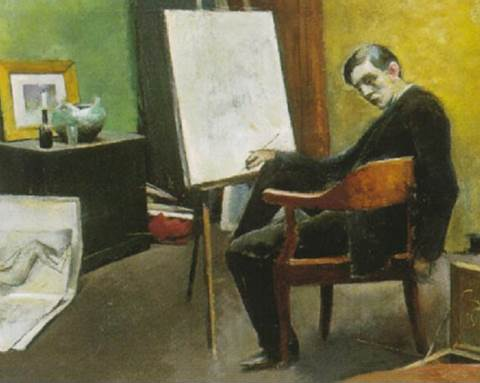
Painter at His Easel
(1900)
