= Alfred Ehrhardt =

German photographer, educator, writer and documentary filmmaker

- Born: Alfred Franz Adolf Ehrhardt; 5 March 1901; Triptis
- Died: 29 May 1984 (aged 83); Hamburg
- Education: Weißenfels, teachers college, Bauhaus
- Known for: painting, photography, filmmaking
- Notable work: Ehrhardt, Alfred; Dingelstedt, Kurt (1937). Das Watt: mit einem Vorwort von Kurt Dingelstedt [The Wadden Sea: with a foreword by Kurt Dingelstedt] (in German). Hamburg: Heinrich Ellermann.
- Style: New objectivity
- Spouses: Mia Burchard (m. 1931; div. 1933); Lieselotte Dannmeyer (m. 1938)
- Children: Klaus, Jens
- Parents: Karl Alfred Ehrhardt (father); Alma Klara (née Müller) (mother)

Alfred Franz Adolf Ehrhardt (5 March 1901 – 29 May 1984) was a German photographer, educator, writer and documentary filmmaker.

== Early life and education ==
Alfred Ehrhardt was born to Alma Klara (née Müller) and Karl Alfred Ehrhardt in Triptis, in Thuringia, Germany, and attended the Realschule (a type of secondary school) in Gera, and is recorded as a student at the humanist Klosterschule (monastery school) at Roßleben, where he was confirmed on Ascension Day (25 May) during the 1911/12 school year. He then studied music at the teacher training college in Weißenfels, specialising in the organ, on which he especially enjoyed playing the works of Johann Sebastian Bach. In the 1920s, he performed as an organist in northern Germany.

== Pedagogue ==
From 1924 to 1930, Ehrhardt worked as a teacher of art worked in Gera and Marienau-Dahlenburg near Lüneburg, then taught art, music, gymnastics, and track and field athletics at the Gandersheim boarding school founded in 1923 by the reformist educator Max Bondy and his wife Gertrud. They moved the school to Dahlenburg in 1929 where in his gymnastics instruction Ehrhardt focused on artistic and dance-based techniques, inspired by choreographers the Austrian Rudolf von Laban and German, Mary Wigman. In 1926/1927, aged 26, he created the paintings in the crypt of Lamspringe Abbey Church. Though painted over during the Nazi era, they were rediscovered by Axel Christoph Kronenberg and restored over 2007–2010.

After studying music, art history, painting (he painted from 1926 to 1933), and printmaking in Hamburg, Ehrhardt, on leave from his teaching position, attended the Bauhaus in 1927–1928 at the Dessau campus, taking the preliminary course taught by the German artist Josef Albers and the painting classes of Paul Klee and Lyonel Feininger, and was an intern in Oskar Schlemmer's stagecraft workshop. He developed a friendship with Wassily Kandinsky.

Upon returning to the Gandersheim boarding school, Ehrhardt applied the concept of the Bauhaus preliminary course to his art classes with children and teenagers from first grade through high school graduation. Based on this experimental pedagogy, in October 1930, Max Sauerlandt appointed him, with architects Karl Schneider, Fritz Schleifer, and Carl Lang to lecture in material studies at the Hamburg State Art School, which Sauerlandt was reforming in the spirit of the Bauhaus. Alongside the architect Karl Schneider, Ehrhardt introduced "preliminary classes" into the art school's curriculum and taught an elementary, non-traditional design theory—Schleifer in graphic design, Ehrhardt in material experience. As Bruhns notes, exercises with paper, plasticine, plaster, wire, glass, wood, and textiles, encouraged students to explore the material and its design possibilities through experimentation.

== Avant-garde artist ==
At the new exhibition hall for contemporary art (1926-1930), initiated by the Kunstverein (Art Association), Ehrhardt and sculptor Friedrich Wield showed together. In 1931, the Hamburg Art Association held a solo exhibition of his paintings, drawings, and prints. Hempel notes of this period an increased degree of continuity and interconnections between the arts that yielded fruitful innovations. The Hamburg avant-garde of the 1920s, from the Hamburg Secession, was notable for the excitement that surrounded its artists, some still known today: Friedrich Ahlers-Hestermann, the married couple Emil and Dorothea Maetzel(-Johannsen), Anita Rée, Willem Grimm, Eduard Bargheer, Rolf Nesch, and Karl Ballmer. A lively meeting place for these artists was at Sievekingsallee 85, the house of dermatologist and urologist Dr. Siegfried Julius and his wife Li, which was full of art treasures; the collector's openness to modernism and commissioning of works drew younger members of the Secession who emphasised fundamental elements of visual art—line, surface, colour, and composition—to independent effect. Avant-garde artists outside the Secession also joined the Julius' salon, including Ehrhardt, and Richard Haizmann, Naum Slutzky, and Ervin Bossanyi. Ehrhardt was applying the musical concept of "polyphony" to his painting, to some extent following Kandinsky and Klee, though his work in that medium, as with that of others such as Willy Davidson, Walther Tanck, and Willi Nass, has been largely lost or forgotten due to destruction by the National Socialists and the war.

Ehrhardt married his first wife Mia Burchard, a member of the Warburg banking family and in 1932 his first son, Klaus, was born. That year, Ehrhardt's book Design Theory: The Practice of Contemporary Art and Craft Education was published, which formally follows the exercises of the Bauhaus, but draws on conservative ideological concepts of the Deutscher Werkbund and is described by critics as "latently proto-National Socialist." Webster notes that Ehrhardt "published a number of smaller guides to landscape and water photography, all of them clearly in the style of the 'New Vision' and interpreted in a rather idyllic way of seeing the world that thus fitted the modern view as well as conforming to the ideology of National Socialism."

In 1933, Ehrhardt, along with other colleagues, was dismissed because his affiliation with the Bauhaus was classified by the National Socialists as cultural Bolshevik. He protested this in several letters. He asked Paul Schrader, an NSDAP member in the administration, to intercede on his behalf within the party. He wrote to Senator Witt that he had been "an enthusiastic supporter and registered member of the völkisch-nationalist movement since 1921." He enclosed letters about him from individuals known for their völkisch leanings. However, with these interventions proving unsuccessful, his marriage ended in divorce, and in 1933 he found a position as organist and choirmaster in Cuxhaven, which he held until 1936.

== Photographer ==
It was only after his dismissal by the National Socialists in 1933, when Ehrhardt was considered a "cultural Bolshevik" due to his Bauhaus ties, that the artist turned to photography. Ehrhardt, between 1933 and 1936 produced photographs depicting sand structures shaped by wind and sea as abstractions, a Modernist genre scorned as 'degenerate' by the Nazis. Using a Zeiss Icon camera for 6 x 9 cm negatives, Ehrhardt photographed in detail and with fascination the tidal flats and sand dunes on excursions to the Wadden Sea between Scharhörn and Neuwerk, and in 1934 also to the Curonian Spit on the Baltic Sea. In the winter semester of 1934/35, he received a professorship at the Askov Adult Education Centre in Southern Jutland, Denmark, taking a leave of absence for this period.

With his book See Sand Sonne (Sea Sand Sun), Arvid Gutschow had established a distinct tradition of avant-garde, North German photobooks inspired by the regional landscape; from the 1920s to the 1940s, photographed seascapes appeared in 43 illustrated books and photo books dedicated primarily to the North Sea and its landscapes.

From Ehrhardt's two photographic series, the Hamburg Arts and Crafts Association first presented an exhibition of over 100 works in Das Watt (The Wadden Sea) in May 1936, then a show titled Wind and Sand in 1937 in Berlin and other German cities and later also in London, Paris, Stockholm, and Copenhagen. The State of Hamburg purchased some of the works, and Das Watt with 96 of his images was published in 1937 with the Hamburg publisher Heinrich Ellermann, the first of Ehrhardt's thirteen photo books produced by the end of the war. The series is considered Ehrhardt's most successful and established his reputation as an avant-garde photographer, amongst Albert Renger-Patzsch, Hugo Schmölz, Adolf Lazi, Walter Peterhans, Wilhelm Castelli, Werner Mannsfeldt, Andreas Feininger, and Arvid Gutschow.

The book "Das Watt" presented Ehrhardt's photographs as single-page copperplate engravings, with two images per double page. In contrast to Gutschow's book, which relied entirely on the power of photography, the publisher contextualized Ehrhardt's images with captions. Ehrhardt took many photographs from a standing position, holding the camera horizontally. Explanatory titles such as "Taken in Gusty Winds," "Incoming Tidal Water," or "Riverbank with Clear Current Patterns" attempt to ground the viewer's abstract perception in reality; the intention is not to surrender solely to transcendent aesthetics, but also to rationally comprehend what is depicted. Compared to the layout of Gutschow's See Sand Sonne, Ehrhardt took a more conservative approach, less interested in the more daring perspectives of the New Objectivity movement than in the transformations of the subject itself.

Writing about his work in an illustrated essay "Tidal Effects upon the Ocean Floor" (1938), for the July 1938 Canadian Geographical Journal, Ehrhardt presents the Wadden Sea as a unique geographical laboratory of aesthetic value. He proposes that the twice-daily exposure of the intertidal flats allows direct observation of the geomorphological processes by which tides, currents and wind continually shape the sea floor, evidence may enable scientific interpretation of ancient sedimentary formations and for reconstructing the evolving past environments. Simultaneously, such naturally formed patterns possess an intrinsic artistic quality, revealing the abstract beauty of elemental forces acting upon the landscape. His photography, made possible in the treacherous environment (the water-saturated Mahlsand in which people become deeply embedded and cannot free themselves) by recently developed lightweight cameras; "No year passes that the "Watt" between the Elbe and Weser does not demand a toll of from 20 to 30 lives." His extended series (sampled with thirteen illustrations) arguably delivers scientific documentation with artistic interpretation, capturing transient landforms and dynamic coastal processes previously inaccessible or unrecorded. Photography, he concludes, bridges geography and art.

Ehrhardt's close association with Karl Blossfeldt is evident in his close-up and micro-photographs published as Die Kristalle (The Crystals) in 1939, and Die Muscheln und die Schnecken (Shells and Snails), in 1941.

== Reception ==
Christiane Stahl, Director of the Alfred Ehrhardt Foundation, reveals the merging of Bauhaus experimental Neues Sehen and Neue Sachlichkeit in his "natural philosophy" and the aesthetic alignment and political evasion of his work during the Third Reich, while for Hempel the influence of New Objectivity was apparent in his placing great emphasis on precise representation, employing strong cropping and graphic abstraction, which for Ehrhardt aided his effort to represent "the animate essence of matter, for the higher power hidden behind simple things, which is why he was called the 'natural philosopher with a camera.'"

Osman, reporting Ehrhardt's portrayal of nature as a timeless force that transcends humankind, quotes his statement that: "Certainly, the world is beautiful, but it is so much more, and it is this 'much more' that should matter to us, namely the appearance of the world as imperishable vitality."

Du Pont, in the catalogue of the 1986 San Francisco Museum of Modern Art exhibition Photography, a facet of modernism considers Ehrhardt's 1936 Düne, Kurische Nehrung, Ostdeutschland his "most daring" in its tilting of the horizon at a forty-five-degree angle. Acknowledging that the pictorial device was widely used after the mid-twenties by avant-garde artists working in Germany, she sees it "given a fresh interpretation. Ehrhardt's radical perspective creates a feeling of cosmic space, implying that nature's mysteries are scaleless. His intent was to suggest that in the arrangement of grains of sand the answer to some of life's riddles could, perhaps, be found."

Elsewhere Van Deren Coke relates Ehrhardt to Arvid Gustschow's photobook See Sand Sonne (Sea Sand Sun) in his radical break with convention in depiction of landscape:

To our eyes, conditioned to viewing paintings that are involved with imagery parallel to the picture's plane or that have forms that seem to shift toward deep, almost infinite space, the photographs that Ehrhardt made of sandy shallows by the Baltic Sea are especially exciting. The spiritual stimuli of nature was deeply rooted in German philosophy. Ehrhardt was seeking to evoke the essence of nature when he reduced his subjects, such as the sand flats and shells, to their rudimentary shapes in order to convey the idea that the multiplicity of forms they assumed grew out of similar patterns of growth and time. The concepts he was dealing with were old, but his photographs were a departure from tradition-considering the high level of artistic achievement: His use of middle-gray tones, simplified forms, and ambiguous effects of space are unique in the photography of the 1930s.

Hempel notes that "even more so than Gutschow, Ehrhardt focused on forms, structures, and patterns; an interest that stemmed from his material experiments as an art teacher."

== Hamburg ==
Ehrhardt married Lieselotte Dannmeyer (daughter of the meteorologist Ferdinand Dannmeyer) in 1938, and their son Jens Ehrhardt was born in 1942. That same year, his Hamburg home was destroyed in a bombing raid. He received an offer from printer Georg Hartmann, the owner of the Bauer type foundry in Frankfurt am Main, to use his country house in Burgjoß in the Spessart mountains, where the family lived until their Hamburg house was rebuilt in 1947. Ehrhardt photographed Hartmann's art collection and also Frankfurt's old town before its destruction by Allied bombing raids, the latter being published in the 1950 photo book Alt-Frankfurt (Old Frankfurt).

Though he had little experience in the genre, Ehrhardt unexpectedly was given a commission by the Chamber of Commerce for industrial photography in Hamburg for a publication “Hamburg as an Industrial Place” through which the Hamburg Chamber of Commerce wanted to counter the impression that the Hanseatic city was primarily a port and trading centre. Consequently, from February to March 1952, Ehrhardt photographed factories and facilities in Hamburg of such companies as Shell, Montblanc, Sanella, Steinway & Sons, Carl Kühne, the Allgemeine Telefonfabrik, the Bergedorfer and the Ottenser Eisenwerk.

== Filmmaker ==
In 1937, and during the Third Reich period Ehrhardt began making documentary films including Urkräfte am Werk, 1939 about the Wadden Sea and Nordische Urwelt, 1941 in Iceland. Gwóźdź considers them unique among such films (and not limited to their era), in applying aesthetics of the Bauhaus and of the New Photography movement, but eluding mainstream Nazi propaganda. As a freelance director and writer, Ehrhardt later filmed in Flanders, Bohemia, and Moravia, on commission by government agencies. News of the impending destruction of his Hamburg memorial on the Kleine Alster and the nationwide acts of violence against his art hastened sculptor Ernst Barlach's death in October 1938. Ten years later Ehrhardi remembered him and his struggle in two films.

Also in 1948 he founded the film production Alfred-Ehrhardt-Film, and its first documentary film was about Hans Brüggemann's Bordesholm altarpiece in Schleswig. The production was successful at the Venice Biennale. He made the film "Kunst unserer Zeit. Skulptur auf der documenta ('Art of Our Time. Sculpture at documenta') in 1960, and by 1973 he had made around sixty more documentaries, which won awards, including the German Film Prize in the cultural film category for Ernst Barlach I.: The Fighter (1951) Game of Spirals (1952) Portugal - Unknown Land by the Sea (1953).

== Legacy ==
Ehrhardt's rediscovery, along with other forgotten and lost photographers from the 1920s, was due largely to Ann and Jürgen Wilde's contact with him in 1972, and their Galerie Wilde (so named since 1974) which presented exhibitions and in twelve portfolios between 1974 and 1981, with a focus being New Objectivity photography in Germany, exemplified in works by Ehrhardt, Karl Blossfeldt, August Sander, Albert Renger-Patzsch, and Aenne Biermann from the 1920s and 30s. In the case of Ehrhardt, the Wildes focused on his series on the Wadden Sea and the Curonian Spit.

The Alfred Ehrhardt Foundation in Berlin, which moved from Cologne in December 2009, is dedicated to the scholarly study of the work of Alfred Ehrhardt and has maintained his estate since his death in 1984.

== Selected publications ==
- Ehrhardt, Alfred (1932). Gestaltungslehre die Praxis eines Zeitgemässen Kunst- und Werkunterrichts [Design Theory: The Practice of Contemporary Art and Craft Education]. Forschungen und Werke zur Erziehungswissenschaft v.16 (in German). Weimar: Böhlau.
- Ehrhardt, Alfred (1938). Die kurische Nehrung [The Curonian Spit] (in German). Hamburg: H. Ellermann. OCLC 19037058.
- Ehrhardt, Alfred; Tesdorpf, Karl Wilhelm (1938). Niederdeutsche Altarschreine [Low German Altars] (in German). Hamburg: H. Ellermann. OCLC 3012497.
- Ruge, Werner; Ehrhardt, Alfred (1939). Die Melodie des Lebens Ein Bildbuch aus d. Zeit der Wende abendländischen Denkens. Mit mikroskopischen Aufnahmen v. Alfred Ehrhardt [The Melody of Life: An Illustrated Book from a Turning Point in Western Thought. With Microphotographs by Alfred Ehrhardt.] (in German). Leipzig: Reclam. OCLC 251320393.
- Ehrhardt, Alfred; Waldemar, Schornstein (1939). Kristalle: 64 aufnahmen von Alfred Ehrhardt [Crystals: 64 images by Alfred Ehrhardt] (in German). Hamburg: Heinrich Ellermann. OCLC 1489798954.
- Ehrhardt, Alfred; Dannmeyer, Ferdinand (1939). Iceland. Hamburg: Ellermann. OCLC 252923341.
- Ehrhardt, Alfred (1939). Mittelalterlicher Taufen aus Erz und Stein [Medieval baptismal fonts made of bronze and stone] (in German). Heinrich Ellermann, Hamburg. OCLC 17369218.
- Heuer, Alfred; Ehrhardt, Alfred (1940). Alfred Ehrhardt: Niederdeutsche Madonnen [Alfred Ehrhardt: Low German Madonnas] (in German). Hamburg. OCLC 838036879.
- Ehrhardt, Alfred; Verschaeve, Cyriel (1943). Ewiges Flandern: ein Bildwerk in 180 Tafeln. Hamburg: Broschek & Co.

== Filmography ==
List of films by Ehrhardt as director, screenwriter, director of photography, editor, sound engineer, producer, and/or unit production manager.

- 1937–1938: Urkräfte am Werk ('Elemental Forces at Work') – director; screenwriter; director of photography
- 1939: Deutsche Kultur in Böhmen und Mähren ('German Culture in Bohemia and Moravia'): director; director of photography
- 1941: Flanderns germanisches Gesicht ('Flanders' Germanic Face'): director
- 1941: Leinen aus Kortryk ('Linen from Kortryk'): director
- 1941: Nordische Urwelt ('Nordic Primeval World'): director; director of photography
- 1943: Prager Barock ('Prague Baroque'): director of photography
- 1944: Land hinterm Deich ('Land Behind the Dike'): director of photography
- 1948: Der große Brüggemann-Altar ('The Great Brüggemann Altar'): director
- 1948–1949: Ein Marienleben ('A Life of Mary'): director; director of photography
- 1948–1949: Die Gottesmutter ('The Mother of God'): director; director of photography
- 1949: Ernst Barlach I: Der Kämpfer ('Ernst Barlach I: The Fighter'): director; director of photography
- 1949: Ernst Barlach II: Der Überwinder ('Ernst Barlach II: The Overcomer'): director
- 1949–1950: Inselfahrt ('Island Journey'): director; director of photography
- 1950: Der Ångerman-Älv: Nordschwedens großer Strom ('The Ångermanälven: North Sweden's Great River'): director; screenwriter; director of photography; editor; unit production manager
- 1951: Spiel der Spiralen ('Play of Spirals'): director
- 1951–1952: Portugal, unbekanntes Land am Meer ('Portugal, Unknown Land by the Sea'): director; screenwriter; director of photography; editor; sound; producer
- 1952: Das steinerne Antlitz Portugals: Architektur einer großen Vergangenheit ('The Stone Face of Portugal: Architecture of a Great Past'): director; screenwriter; director of photography; editor; producer
- 1953–1954: Scanno ('Scanno'): director; director of photography; editor
- 1953–1954: Schicksal und Vermächtnis ('Fate and Legacy'): director; director of photography; editor; producer
- 1954: Das Bronzetor ('The Bronze Gate'): director; director of photography; editor
- 1955: Ich hatt' einen Kameraden ('I Had a Comrade'): director; director of photography
- 1955: Begnadete Hände ('Gifted Hands'): director; director of photography; editor; producer
- 1955–1956: Tabak ('Tobacco'): director; screenwriter; director of photography; editor; producer
- 1956–1957: Insel im Ozean: Madeira ('Island in the Ocean: Madeira'): director
- 1956–1959: Tanz der Muscheln ('Dance of the Shells'): director; director of photography; editor
- 1957: Blume des Meeres ('Flower of the Sea'): director; screenwriter; editor
- 1957: Mythos Pferd ('The Myth of the Horse'): director
- 1958: Geschöpf ohnegleichen ('Peerless Creature'): director
- 1958: Sancta Maria ('Sancta Maria'): director
- 1958: Korkland Portugal ('Cork Country Portugal'): director
- 1959: Die Küste der Fischer ('The Coast of the Fishermen'): director
- 1959: Kunst unserer Zeit I: Skulptur 1945–1959 ('Art of Our Time I: Sculpture 1945–1959'): director; screenwriter; director of photography
- 1960: Kunst unserer Zeit II: Malerei 1945–1959 ('Art of Our Time II: Painting 1945–1959'): director; screenwriter; director of photography; editor; unit production manager
- 1960–1962: Portwein ('Port Wine'): director
- 1961–1962: Dampfende Erde ('Steaming Earth'): director
- 1962: Gletscher und ihre Ströme (Island) ('Glaciers and Their Rivers (Iceland)'): director; screenwriter; director of photography
- 1962: Vulkanisches Antlitz ('Volcanic Face'): director; screenwriter; director of photography
- 1962–1963: Eis: Grönländische Skizzen ('Ice: Greenland Sketches'): director; director of photography
- 1964: Die Bernwardsäule von Hildesheim ('The Bernward Column of Hildesheim'): director; screenwriter; director of photography
- 1964: Tausend Jahre nach Christi Geburt ('A Thousand Years After Christ's Birth'): director
- 1964: Korallen: Skulpturen der Meere ('Corals: Sculptures of the Seas'): director
- 1965: Das Boot von Torreira ('The Boat of Torreira'): director; screenwriter; director of photography; editor; unit production manager
- 1974: Masken und Figuren: Schwarzafrikas kostbares Gut ('Masks and Figures: Black Africa's Precious Heritage'): director; producer

== Exhibitions ==
- 1980–1981, 19 December– February: Avant-Garde Photography in Germany 1919-1939. San Francisco
- 1984: group exhibition at the Photographer's Gallery in London. He died the same year in Hamburg

=== Posthumous ===
- 1988: Berinson Gallery in Berlin
- 1991: Schnakenwinkel-Rotenburg Gallery in Hanover
- 2009, 3 March–1 June: Alfred Ehrhardt–Naturphilosoph mit der Kamera, Museum für Angewandte Kunst, Gera
- 2015, 8 February–17 May: Alfred Ehrhardt – Das Watt. Landesmuseum für Kunst und Kulturgeschichte, Oldenburg
- 2015, 21 May–17 July: Alfred Ehrhardt, Hamburger Industriefotografie 1952, Handelskammer Hamburg, Hamburg
- 2016, 26 February – 2 April: Mona Ardeleanu + Alfred Ehrhardt. Wagner + Partner, Berlin
- 2017, 16 June – 10 September: Zwischen Schlei und Eider: Eine fotografische Bilderreise der 1930/40er Jahre. Stadtmuseum Schleswig, Schleswig
- 2019, 17 May – 30 June: 100 Years German Bauhaus # 2: Konstruktion . Kleinschmidt Fine Photographs, Wiesbaden
- 2024, 14 June–8 September: Wind, Sand Und Wasser. Pinakothek der Moderne, Munich
- 2024–2025, 12 October–23 February: New Vision, New Objectivity and Bauhaus: New Photography Acquisitions from the Siegert Collection. Stuttgart Germany
- 2025, 4 July–12 October: On View - Encounters with the Photographic. Munich, Germany
- 2026/27: 13 November– 28 February: Neu. Sachlich. Fotografie der 1920er- und 1930er-Jahre. Ehrhardt with Ellen Auerbach, Aenne Biermann, Karl Blossfeldt, Trude Fleischmann and others. Leopold Museum, Vienna.

== Collections ==
- Art Institute of Chicago
- Ann and Jürgen Wilde Foundation
- Canadian Centre for Architecture
- Centre Pompidou
- Columbus Museum of Art
- Irish Museum of Modern Art
- J. Paul Getty Museum
- Metropolitan Museum of Art (Dept. of Photographs)
- Museum für Kunst und Gewerbe
- Museum of Fine Arts, Houston
- New Orleans Museum of Art
- San Francisco Museum of Modern Art
- Staatsgalerie Stuttgart
- Städel Museum
- Yokohama Museum of Art
