= Walter Alfred Rosam =

German painter

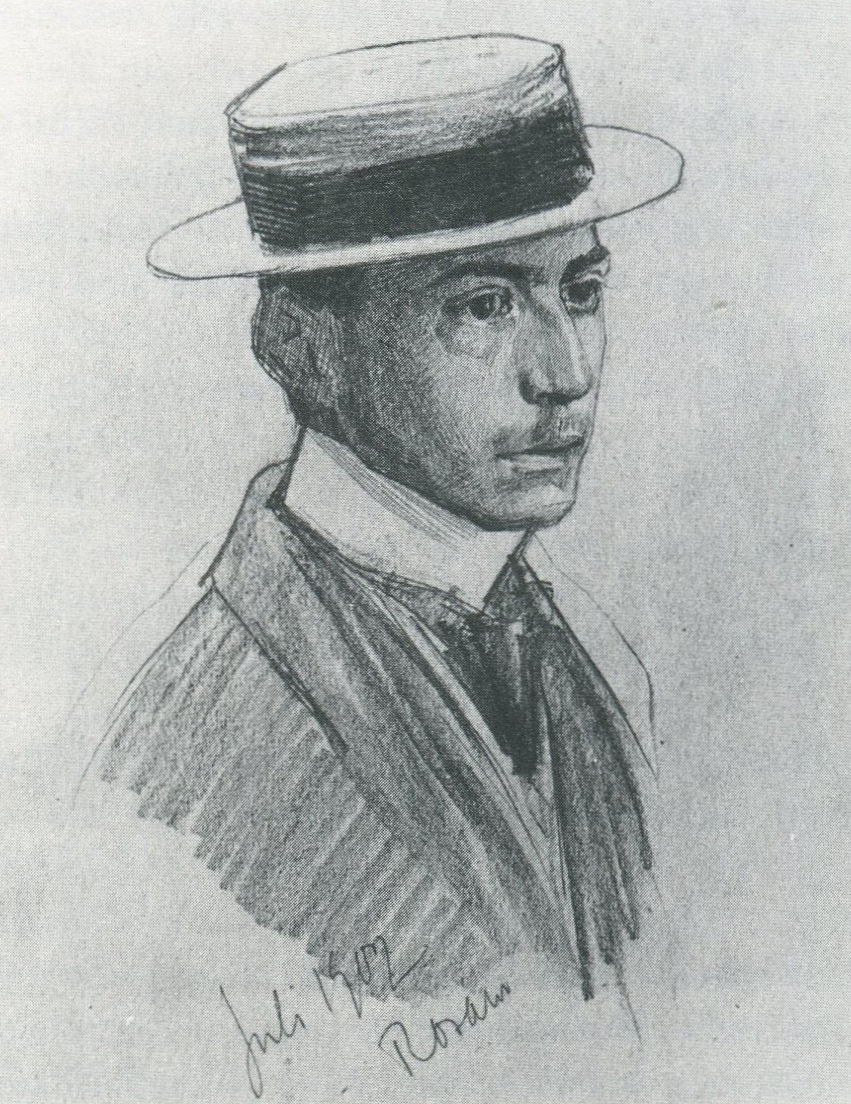
Walter Rosam (1902), portrait by Franz Nölken.

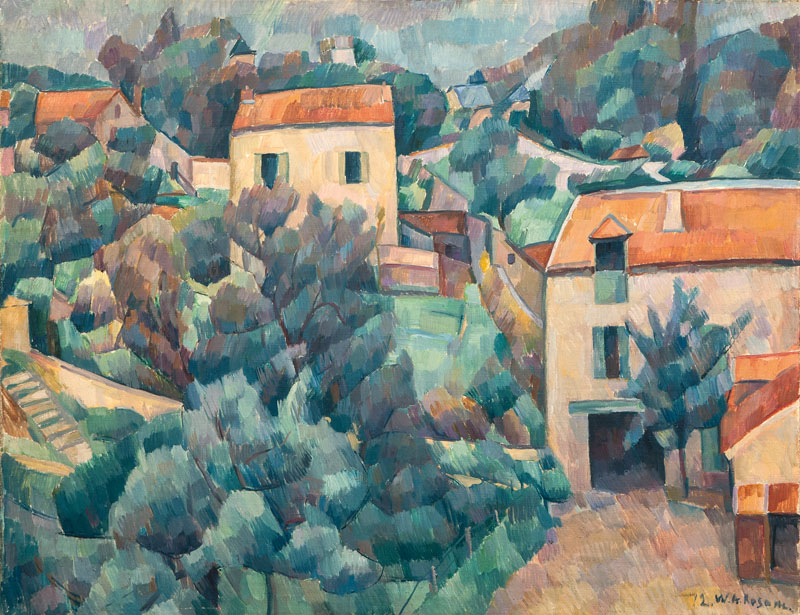
Village in France (Haudricourt?)

Walter Alfred Rosam (25 October 1883, in Hamburg – 14 August 1916, in Ukraine) was a German Post-Impressionist painter of Jewish ancestry; known for still-lifes and landscapes.

== Biography ==
In 1901, he became a student of Arthur Siebelist, co-founder of the Hamburgischer Künstlerklub, which he joined in 1903. The following year, he had his first exhibition at the Galerie Commeter, a highly respected gallery that had been established in 1821. He was married in 1905 and had a daughter in 1906.

With Franz Nölken and Friedrich Ahlers-Hestermann, fellow members of the Künstlerklub, he went to Paris in 1907 and became part of the artistic circle that met at Le Dôme Café. Two years later, he took another trip to Paris with his friends and enrolled for advanced studies with Henri Matisse at his short-lived Académie.

During their time there, they became known as "Die drei Hamburger" as they were always together, painting cityscapes, landscapes in Meulan and nude models at their studio on the Boulevard Edgar-Quinet. However, one of the main supporters of Siebelist and his students, Alfred Lichtwark, rejected their work because he "could not make friends with the teachings of Matisse".

In 1910 and 1911, he took extended study trips to Southern France and Italy. After the outbreak of World War I, he joined the Army in Königsberg. He died in a Russian military hospital near Kovel, on the southern flank of the Eastern Front in 1916.
