= Ernst Rump =

German merchant, art patron and collector

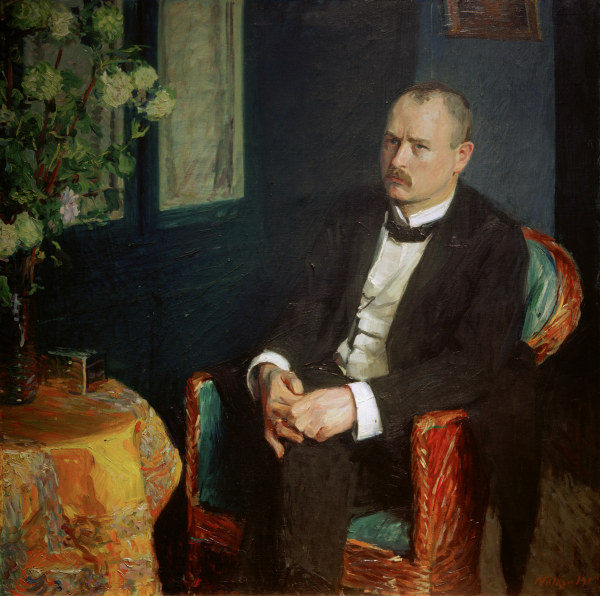
Ernst Rump; portrait by Franz Nölken (1905)

Ernst August Max Friedrich Rump (13 October 1872, Hamburg – 12 January 1921, Hamburg) was a German merchant, art patron and collector. In 1912, he wrote the Lexikon der bildenden Künstler Hamburgs, Altonas und der näheren Umgebung (Encyclopedia of Visual Artists from Hamburg, Altonas and the Surrounding Area), which became a classic; generally referred to as Der Rump.

== Life and career ==
He learned the art of etching in London, from James McNeill Whistler, and gave lessons in Hamburg. When he took over the family business (nautical equipment), he became an avid art collector and patron of young artists; especially those in the Hamburgischer Künstlerklub. He gave special attention to the students of Arthur Siebelist; buying their works and organizing exhibitions. He also supported Alfred Lichtwark, the Director of the Kunsthalle Hamburg although, in 1908, he criticized him for ignoring Siebelist's students.

A few years later, he would have a change of heart himself, when some of his favorite artists (notably, Franz Nölken), went to Paris to attend the Académie Matisse and changed their painting styles as a result. Despite being highly critical of Matisse and his influence on them, he continued to provide support.

He was one of the first collectors to acquire works by Emil Nolde, when Avant-Garde painting was generally not being bought by serious collectors. His fellow collector, Gustav Schiefler, who was not an admirer of Nolde's work, noted that "(Rump) did not appreciate his religious pictures, he only loved the painter of flowers, gardens and landscapes".

In 1912, he published the Lexikon der bildenden Künstler Hamburgs, Altonas und der näheren Umgebung in 500 numbered copies.

In 2005, the Ernst Barlach House held an exhibition; Nolde, Nölken, Modersohn-Becker. The Art-loving Merchant, Ernst Rump. with about 60 works from his collection. At the same time, an expanded version of his Lexikon was published and became known as the Der neue Rump.
