= Arthur Siebelist =

German painter (1870–1945)

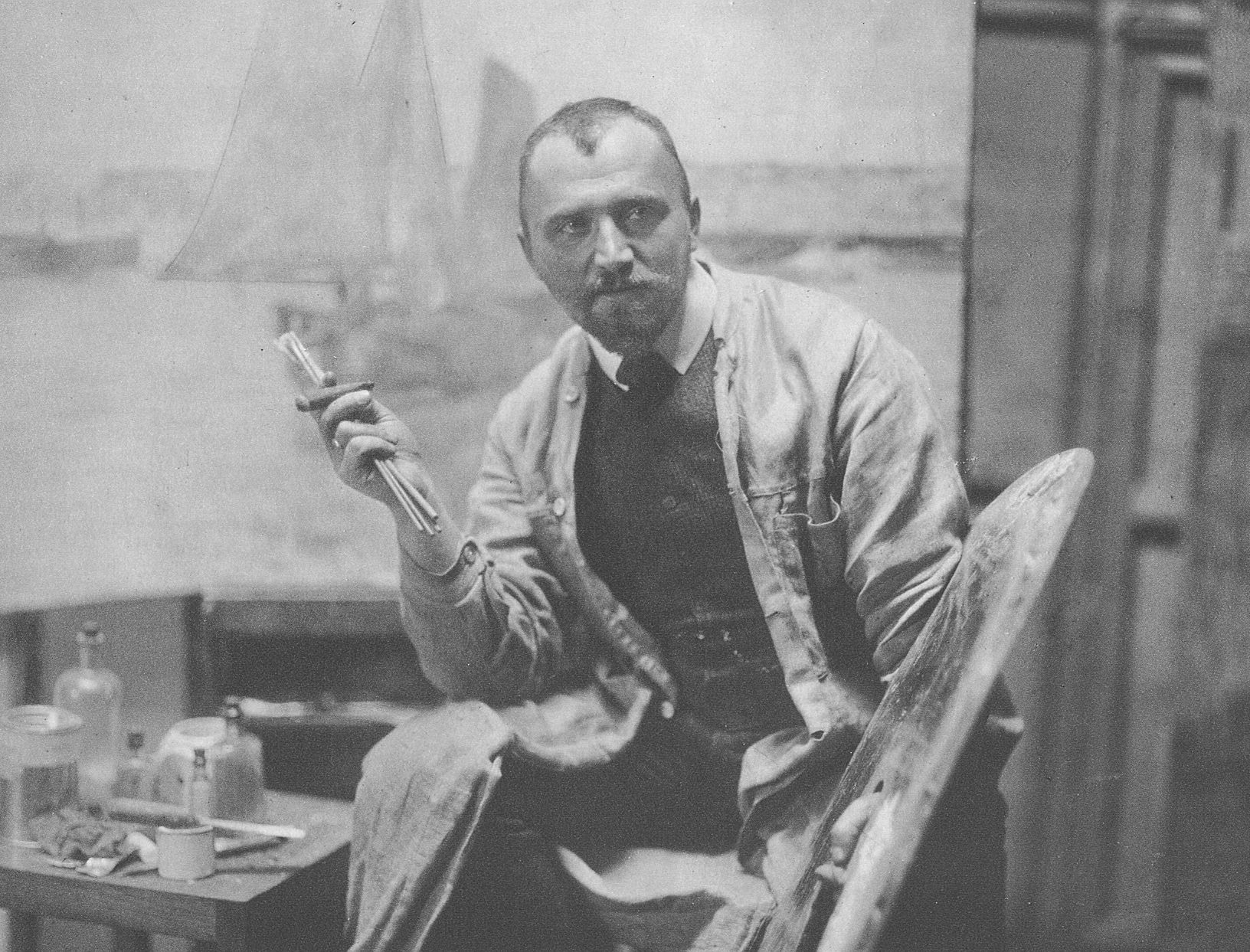
- Siebelist in 1905
- Born: 21 July 1870; Loschwitz, Dresden, Saxony, Germany
- Died: 4 January 1945 (aged 74); Hittfeld, Harburg, Lower Saxony, Germany
- Occupation: Painter
- Style: Impressionism
- Spouse: Gertrud Bulcke
- Children: 1

Arthur Siebelist (21 July 1870, Loschwitz – 4 January 1945, Hittfeld, Harburg District) was a German Impressionist painter.

== Biography ==
He was raised in Hamburg. He had his first art lessons in 1884 at the commercial studios of Georg Hulbe, a bookbinder and leather artisan. In 1890, he spent a year at the "Royal School of Applied Arts" in Munich. This was followed by study trips to the Netherlands, France, Italy and England.

In 1897, he was one of the founding members of the Hamburgischer Künstlerklub, a project initiated by Alfred Lichtwark, Director of the Kunsthalle Hamburg. Other notable early members included Julius von Ehren, Ernst Eitner, Arthur Illies, Friedrich Schaper,Julius Wohlers and Thomas Herbst, the eldest member. A common concern was to create an art school that would teach from life, rather than academically.

In 1899, Siebelist created such a school and began holding classes en plein aire. His first students included Friedrich Ahlers-Hestermann, Franz Nölken, Fritz Friedrichs and Walter Alfred Rosam. His school received support from Ernst Rump, a wealthy businessman and art collector. In 1902, he painted what is probably his most familiar work "My Students and I".

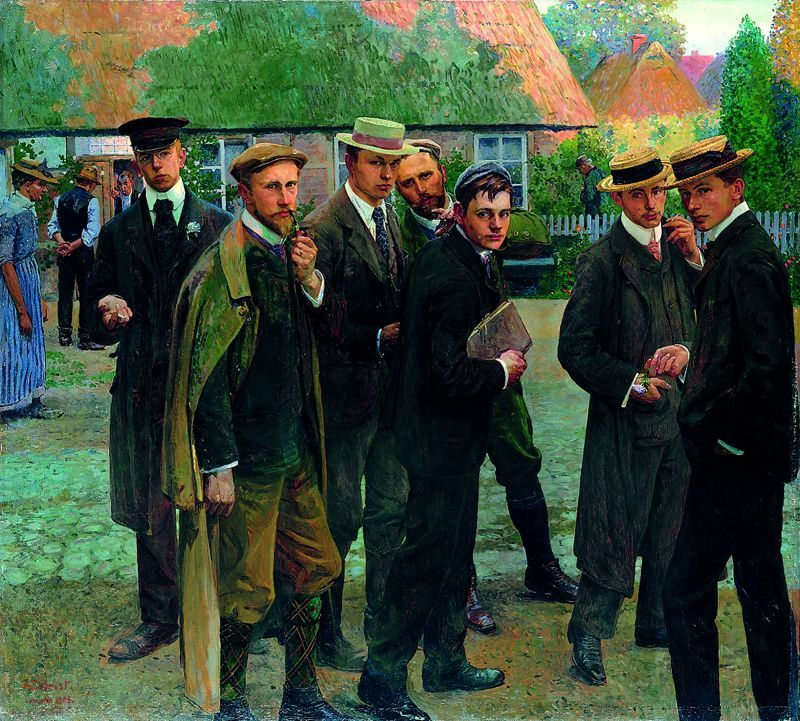
My Students and I

The following year he married Gertrud Bulcke (1875–1925), one of his students. In 1905, he joined the "Hamburger Künstlerverein" and later became a member of the Deutscher Künstlerbund. In 1908, he settled in Hittfeld, a suburb of Hamburg and took work as a book illustrator.

A major exhibition was held at the Kunsthalle on the occasion of his fiftieth birthday in 1920. Many of his works were destroyed during World War II. His son, Walter Siebelist, also became a painter of some note.
