= Thomas Herbst =

Thomas Herbst may refer to:

- Thomas Herbst (footballer) (born 1962), German football manager and player
- Thomas Herbst (painter) (1848–1915), German Impressionist painter
