= Fritz Friedrichs =

Fritz Friedrichs is the name of:

- Fritz Friedrichs (painter) (1882–1928), German painter
- Fritz Walter Paul Friedrichs (1882–1958), German chemist
