= Julius von Ehren =

German painter

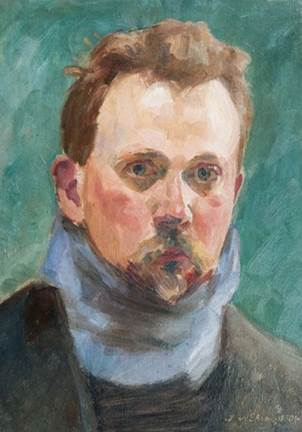
Self-portrait (1904)

Julius von Ehren (23 August 1864 - 8 November 1944) was a German Post-Impressionist painter.

== Biography ==
His father was a sailmaker whose family had been fishing along the Elbe since the 17th century. He attended primary school in Altona. In 1886, thanks to the support of a local charitable fund, he was able to study art with Leopold von Kalckreuth at the Kunstchule Weimar.

In 1891, he was able to transfer to the Academy of Fine Arts, Munich. After 1893, he settled in Hamburg and became a free-lance artist. He would often make study trips along the Elbe, where he worked with Thomas Herbst and painted scenes from village life. He became especially well known for his paintings of ducks.

In 1897, he was one of the founders of the Hamburgischer Künstlerklub. He was also an active member of the Deutscher Künstlerbund and several other professional organizations. Later, he made study trips to Copenhagen and, with his friend Alfred Lichtwark, to Paris. In 1901, he joined the movement known as the Berlin Secession.

After 1910, he participated in fewer exhibitions and his sales decreased dramatically. Lichtwark found it necessary to help support him and his family. During World War I, after Lichtwark's death, he worked as a ship painter. Later, he did tinting for a wholesale print dealer. In 1943, he was finally awarded an "honor pension" by the city of Hamburg, but he died the following year.

== Selected paintings ==
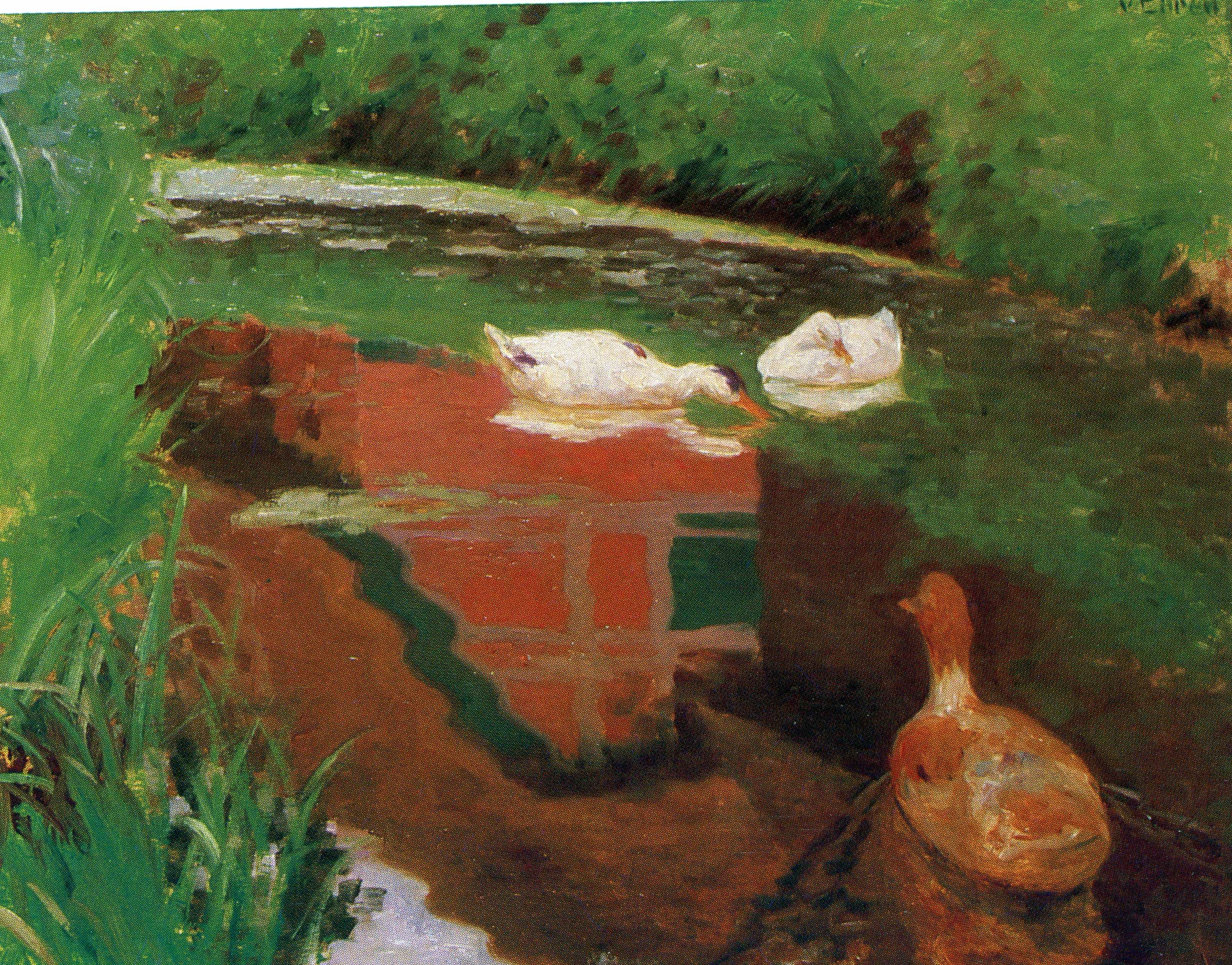
Ducks

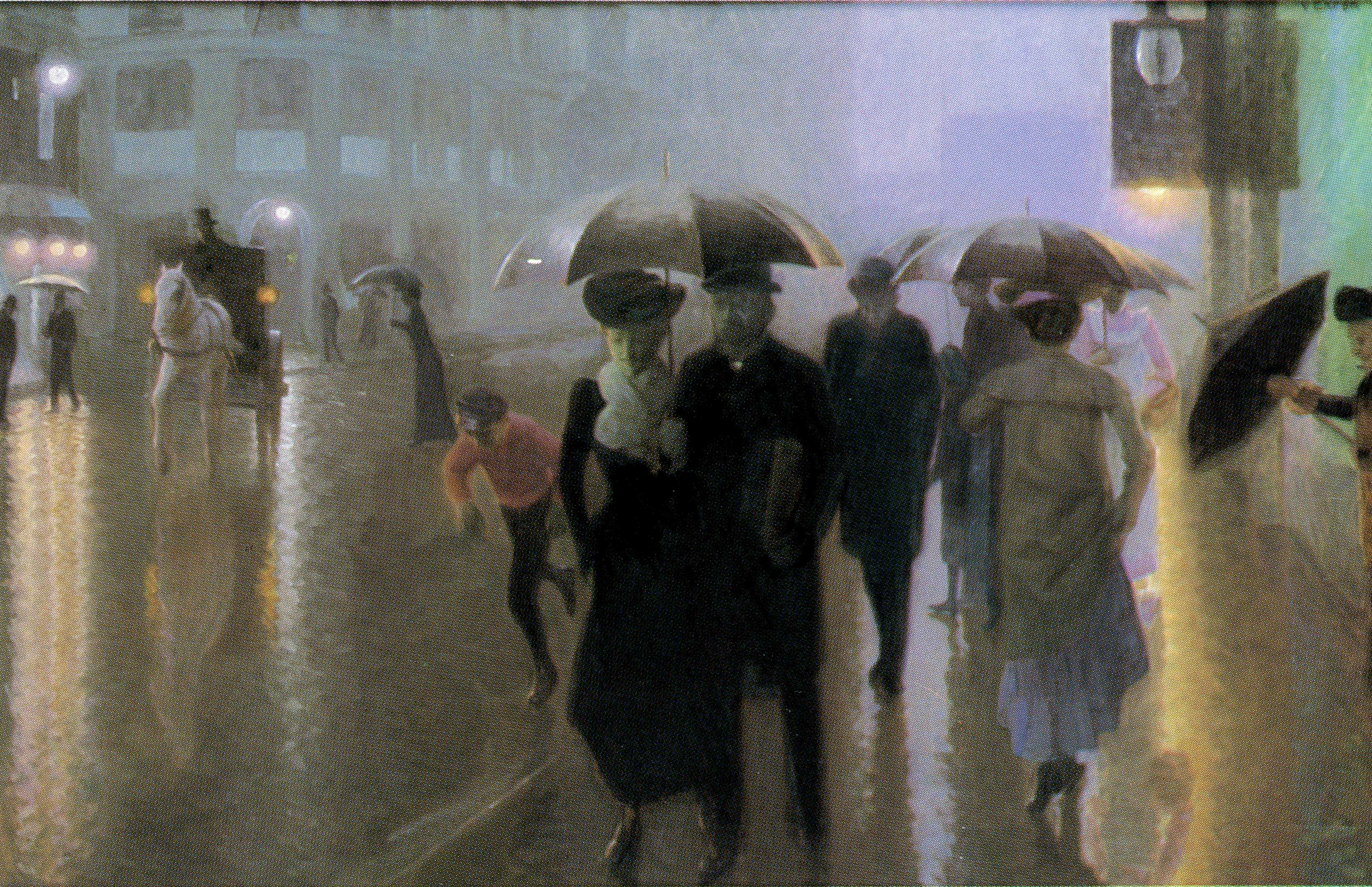
Rainy Weather

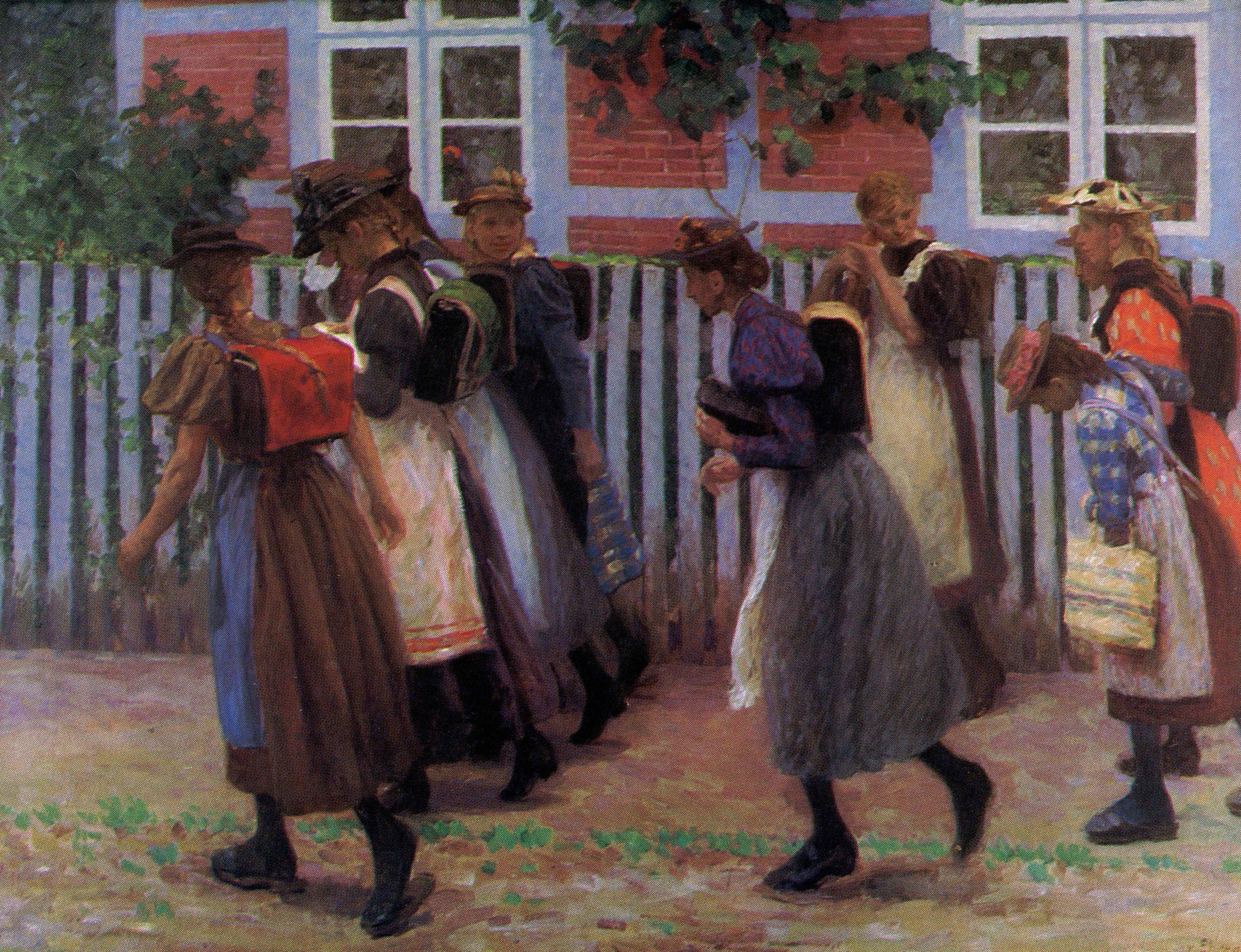
Schoolchildren in Himmelpforten

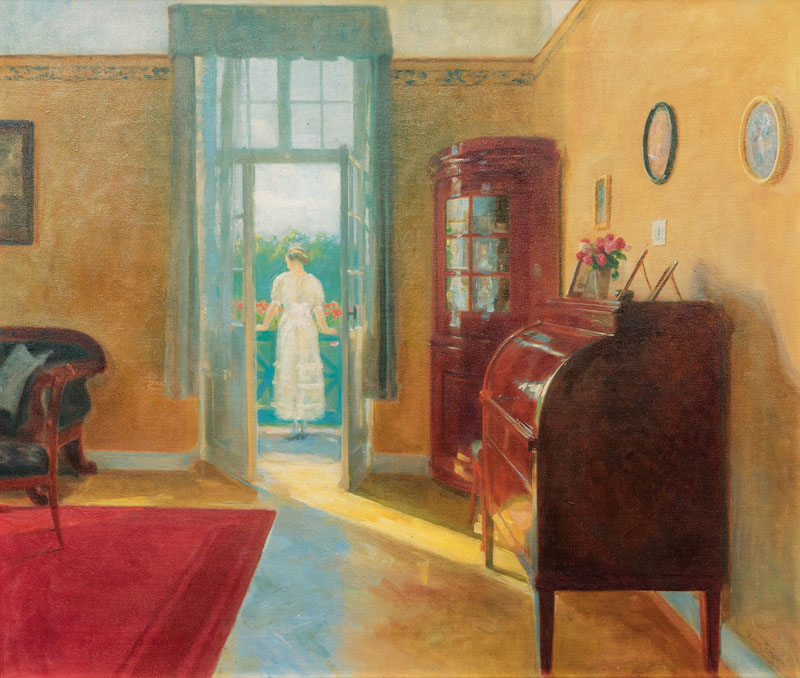
The Balcony

== Sources ==
- Carsten Meyer-Tönnesmann: Der Hamburgische Künstlerclub von 1897. Christians-Verlag, Hamburg 1985 ISBN 3-7672-0919-5.
