= Anita Rée =

German artist

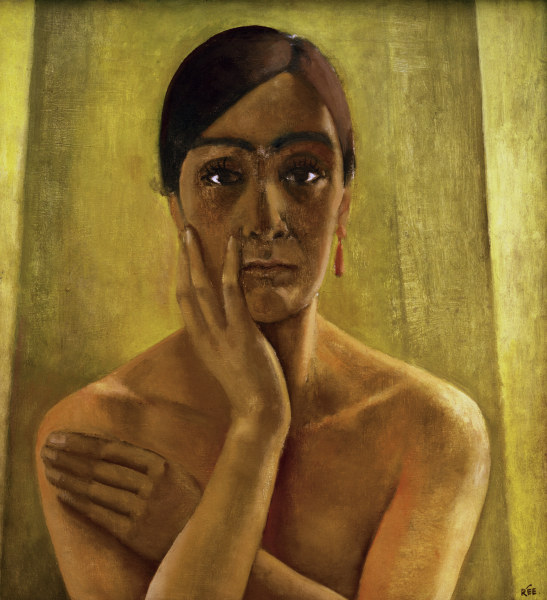
- Self portrait (c.1929), Hamburger Kunsthalle
- Born: 9 February 1885; Hamburg, Germany
- Died: 12 December 1933 (aged 48); Kampen, Germany
- Known for: Painting
- Movement: Avant-garde

Anita Clara Rée (born 9 February 1885 in Hamburg, died 12 December 1933 in Kampen) was a German avant-garde painter during the Weimar Republic. She killed herself after the antisemitic government declared her work degenerate. Her works were saved by a groundskeeper.

== Biography ==
Born into an old Jewish family of Hamburg merchants who traded in goods from India, she was the daughter of Israel Rée and Clara, née Hahn. Anita and her sister Emilie were however baptized and raised as Lutherans, in accordance with the social norms of assimilated upper middle class and upper class Jewish families in Germany at the time.

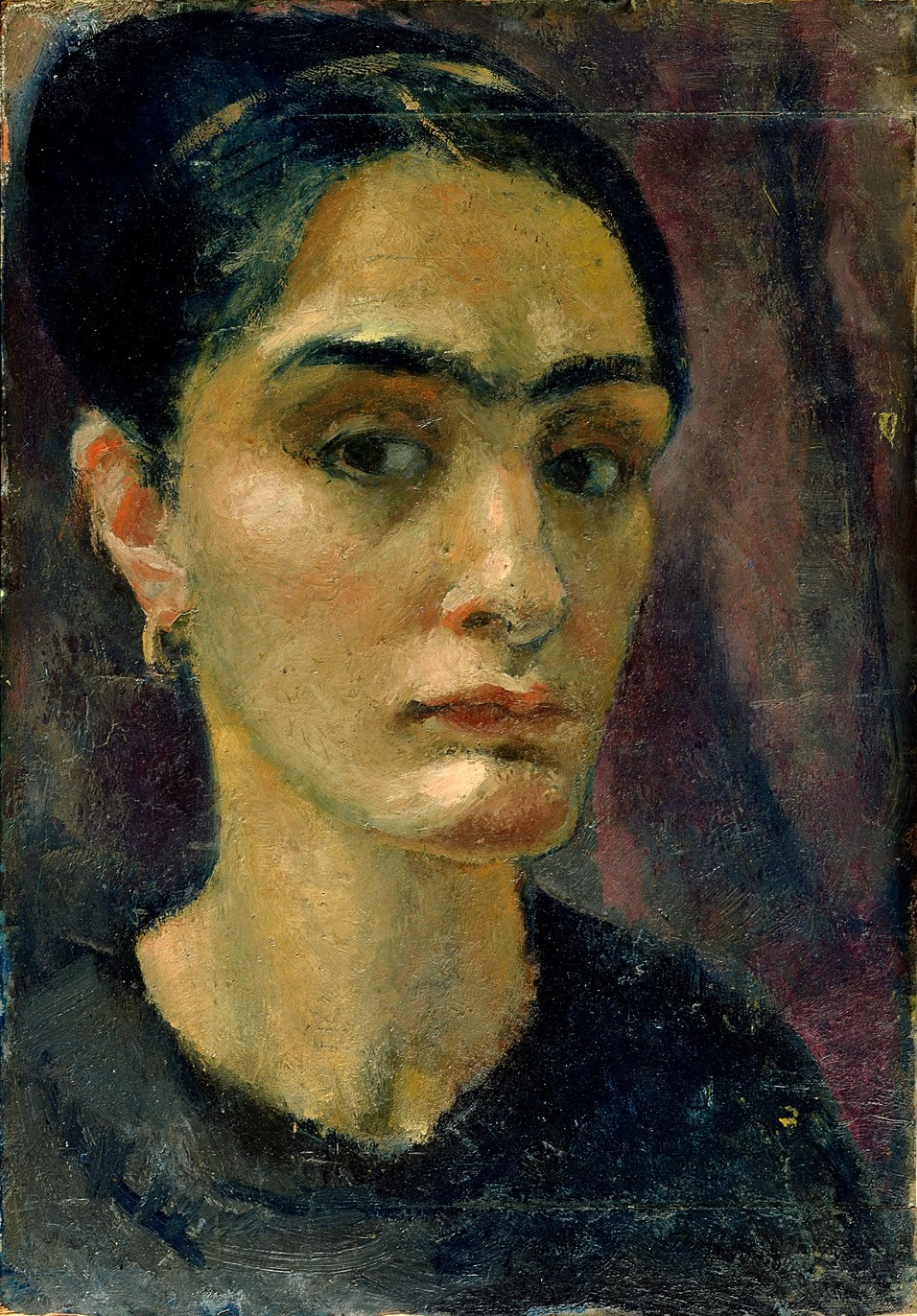
Self-portrait (c.1910)

From 1905, she studied with the Hamburg painter Arthur Siebelist. In 1906, she met Max Liebermann, who recognized her talent and encouraged her to continue her artistic career. Around 1910 she, Franz Nölken and others formed a studio community, but it broke up due to her unrequited love for Nölken. During the winter of 1912–1913, she studied with Fernand Léger in Paris.

In 1913, she participated in a major showing at the Galerie Commeter in Hamburg. From around 1914, Anita Rée gained recognition as a portrait painter. In 1919, she joined the "Hamburg Secession", modeled on similar groups in Berlin and Munich. In 1921, she toured the Tyrol. From 1922 to 1925, her primary residence was in Positano.

She returned to Hamburg in 1926 and helped found GEDOK, an association of women artists. She also created several murals in public buildings, but most were later destroyed by the Nazi government.

In 1930, she received a commission to create a triptych for the altar at the new Ansgarkirche in Langenhorn. The church fathers were not happy with her designs, however, and the commission was withdrawn in 1932 over "religious concerns". Meanwhile, the Nazis had denounced her as a Jew and the Hamburg Art Association called her an "alien". Shortly after, she moved to Sylt.

She committed suicide in 1933, partly as a result of having been subjected to such hostility and continuing harassment by antisemitic forces, partly due to disappointments on the personal level. In a note to her sister, she decried the insanity of the world. In 1937, the Nazis designated Rée's work as "Degenerate art" and began purging it from museum collections. Wilhelm Werner, a groundskeeper at the Kunsthalle Hamburg preserved many of Rée's paintings by hiding them in his apartment.

== Selected works ==
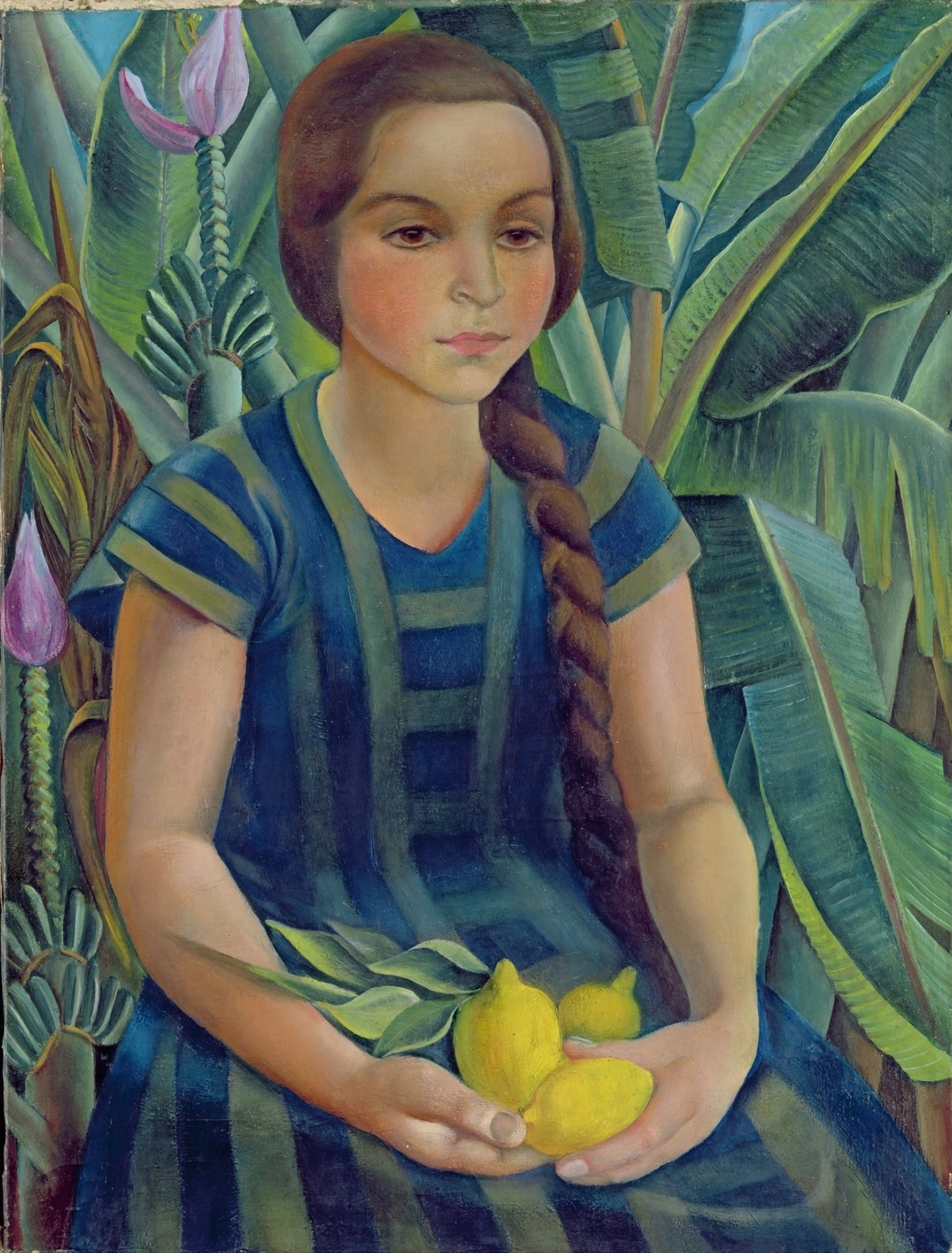
Teresina, 1925,
Hamburger Kunsthalle

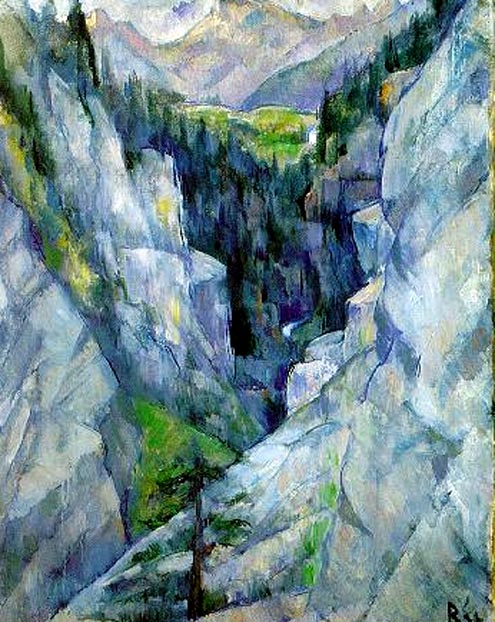
Canyon in Pians, 1921, Hamburger Kunsthalle

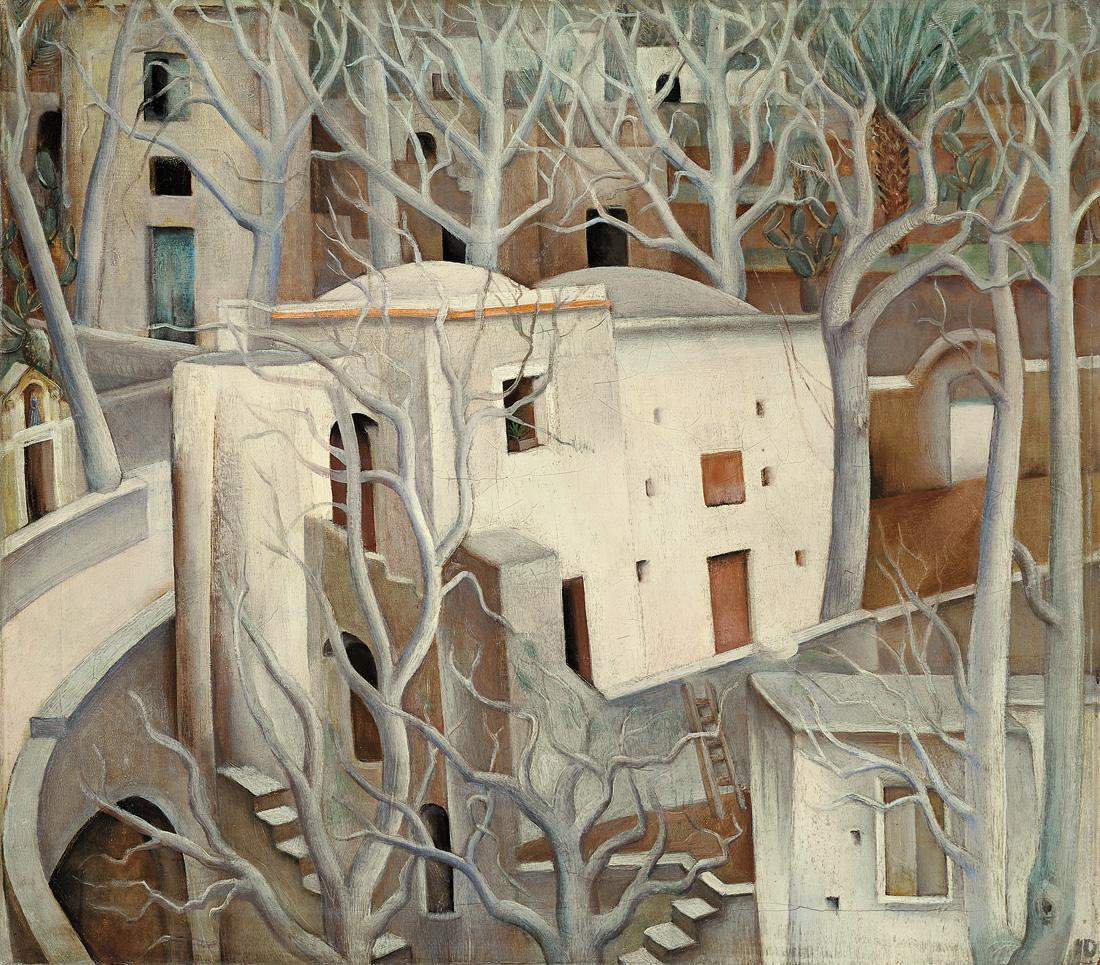
White Trees, 1925,
Hamburger Kunsthalle

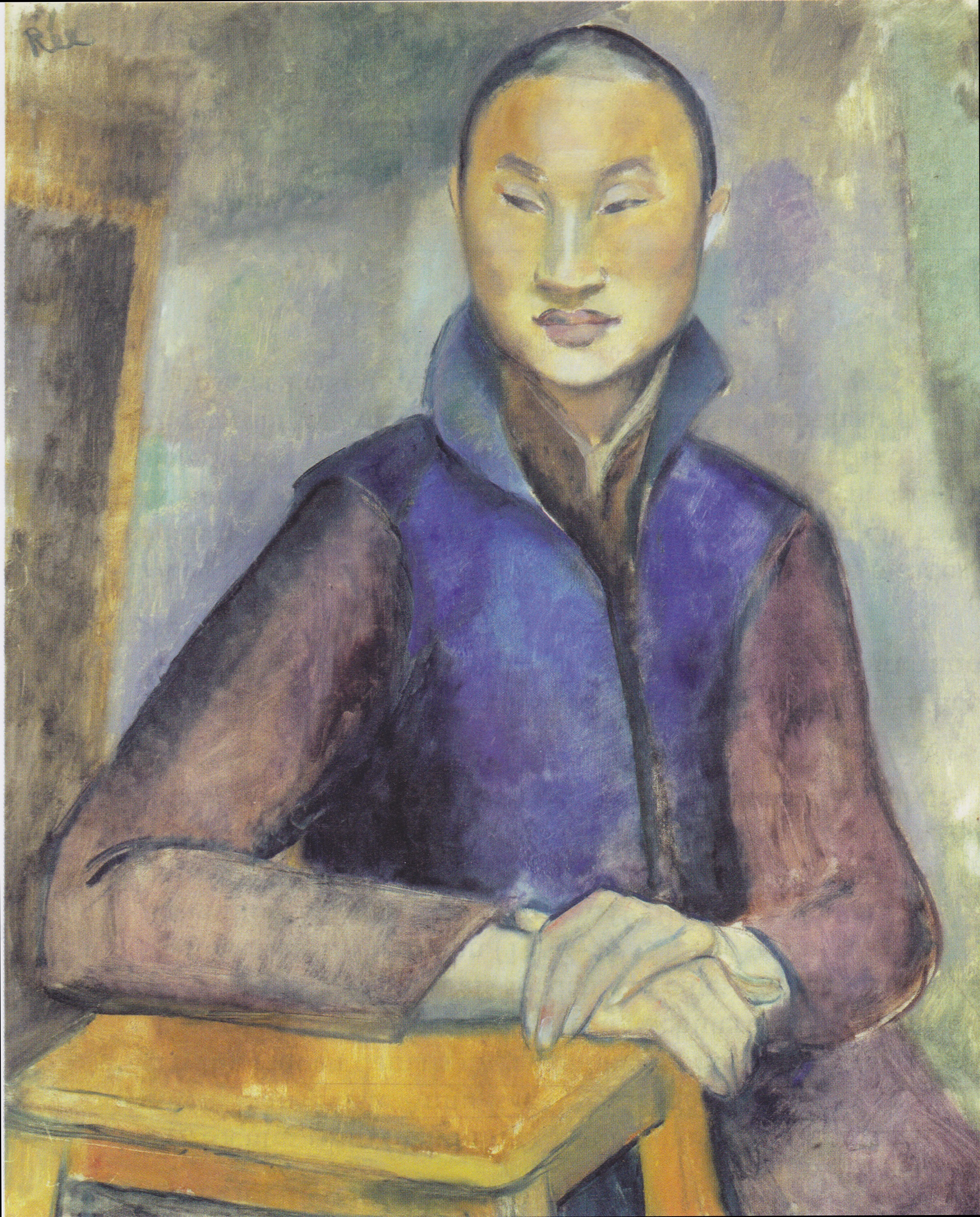
Young Chinese Man, 1919, Hamburger Kunsthalle

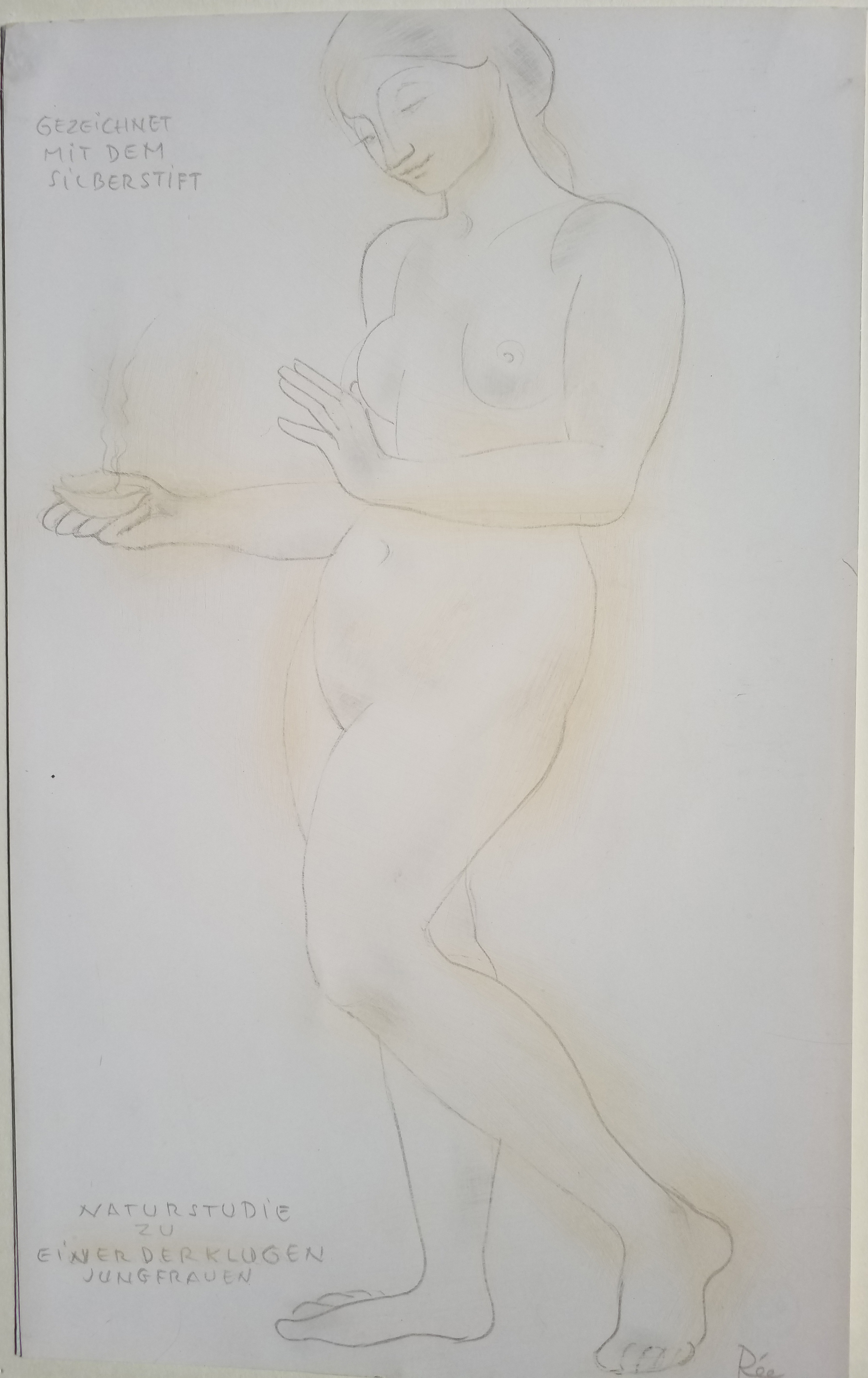
Naturstudie zu einer der klugen Jungfrauen 25 cm × 15.5 cm. A study for the wall-painting in Schule Uferstraße, Hamburg. Oeuvre-catalogue number Z 318 a.

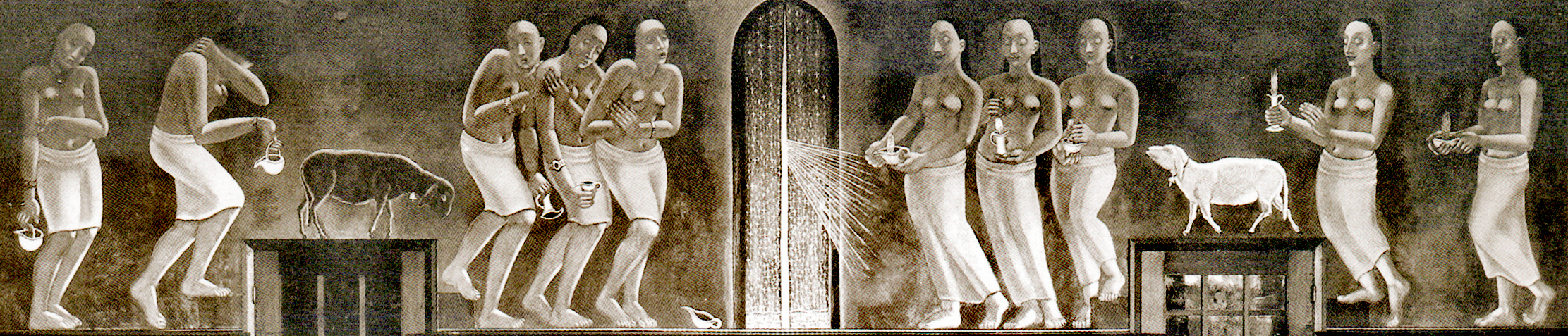
Die klugen und die törichten Jungfrauen, Mural, c. 1930, destroyed

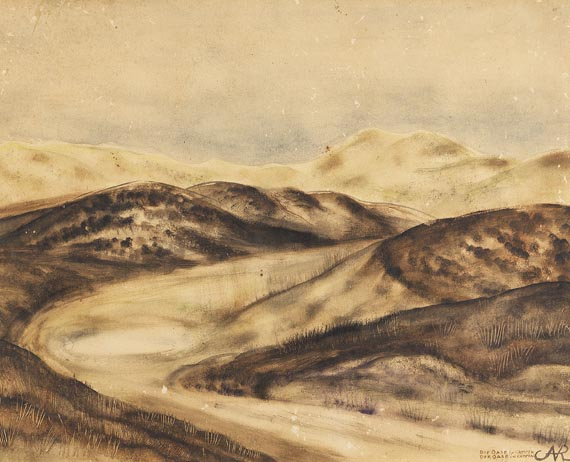
Die Oase in Kampen, 1932/33, Watercolor 39 × 49 cm

== Exhibitions ==
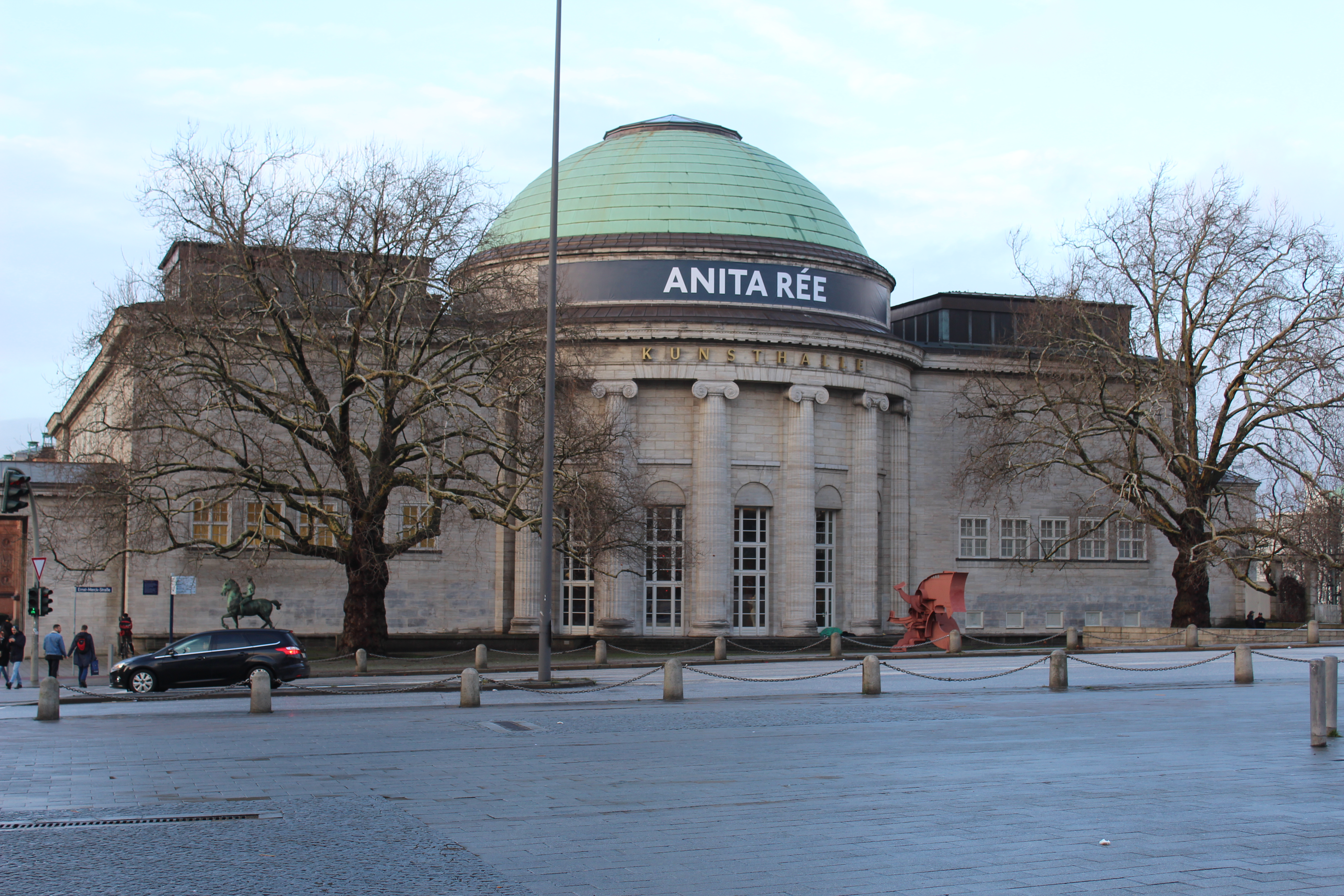
The Hamburger Kunsthalle at the time of the exhibition of Anita Rée (2018)

- 1986 – Eva und die Zukunft. Das Bild der Frau seit der Französischen Revolution, Hamburger Kunsthalle
- 2004 – Kunst der 20er Jahre in Hamburg, Hamburger Kunsthalle
- 2005 – Ausgegrenzt, Hamburger Kunsthalle
- 2006 – Künstlerinnen der Avantgarde, Hamburger Kunsthalle
- 2010 – Himmel auf Zeit. Kunst der 20er Jahre in Hamburg, Hamburger Kunsthalle
- 2011/12: – Die Sammlung des Hausmeisters Wilhelm Werner, Hamburger Kunsthalle, 28. September 2011 bis 15. Januar 2012
- 2017/2018 – Anita Reé. Retrospektive, Hamburger Kunsthalle

== Literature ==
- Carl Georg Heise: Anita Rée. Christians Verlag, Hamburg 1968
- Bettina Roggmann: Anita Rée. In: Eva und die Zukunft. Prestel Verlag, München 1986 (Ausstellungskatalog Hamburger Kunsthalle)
- Jutta Dick, Marina Sassenberg (Hrsg.): Jüdische Frauen im 19. und 20. Jahrhundert. Rowohlt Verlag, Reinbek 1993, ISBN 3-499-16344-6.
- Maike Bruhns: Anita Rée. Leben und Werk einer Hamburger Malerin 1885–1933. Verein für Hamburgische Geschichte, Hamburg 2001, ISBN 3-923356-15-3.
- Maike Bruhns, Jewish Art? Anita Rée and “New Objectivity” In: Key Documents of German-Jewish History, December 6, 2016. doi:10.23691/jgo:article-106.en.v1
- Karin Schick Anita Rée. Retrospektive, Monografie (English), Prestel Verlag, ISBN 978-3-7913-5711-9.
