= Fritz Friedrichs (painter) =

German painter

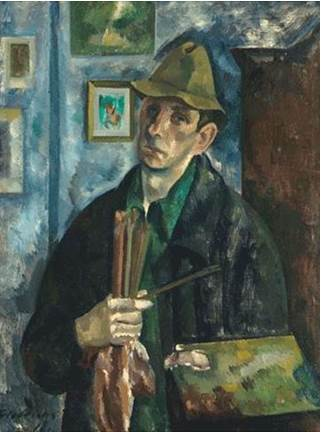
Self-portrait (1918).

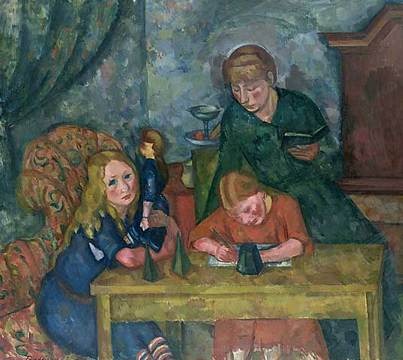
The Children's Room.

Fritz Friedrichs (17 May 1882, Hamburg – 28 July 1928, Hoopte, Harburg District) was a German Post-Impressionist painter.

== Education ==
After completing his primary education in 1898, he enrolled at the Kunstgewerbeschule in Hamburg and, two years later, became a student of Arthur Siebelist. In 1903, together with Siebelist's other private students, he became a member of the Hamburgischer Künstlerklub.

In 1904, he and his fellow students held a major exhibition at the Galerie Commeter, a highly respected gallery that had been established in 1821. Their showing was highly praised by Alfred Lichtwark, head of the Kunsthalle Hamburg.

== Career ==
He took a study trip to the Netherlands in 1908 and, in 1909, exhibited with Die Brücke. The following year, he established his own private art school at his studio. In 1911, he began working as an art critic and married Gertrud Harlos, one of his models.

=== World War I ===
At the beginning of World War I, he was drafted and sent to Poland. After spending some time in a military hospital, he was discharged and went back to exhibiting, notably with the Free Secession in 1919.

== Death and legacy ==
He died in 1928, following a long illness. A major retrospective of his work, "Die Siebelistschüler Fritz Friedrichs und Walter Voltmer" was presented by the Hamburgische Landesbank in 1991.

== Sources ==
- Friedrich Ahlers-Hestermann: Zwischen zwei Fronten – Fritz Friedrichs und unsere Generation, in: Der Kreis, Vol.6, #5/6, 1929
- Carsten Meyer-Tönnesmann: Der Hamburgische Künstlerclub von 1897. Verlag Atelier im Bauernhaus, Fischerhude 1997. ISBN 3-881-32255-8
