= Thomas Herbst (painter) =

German painter

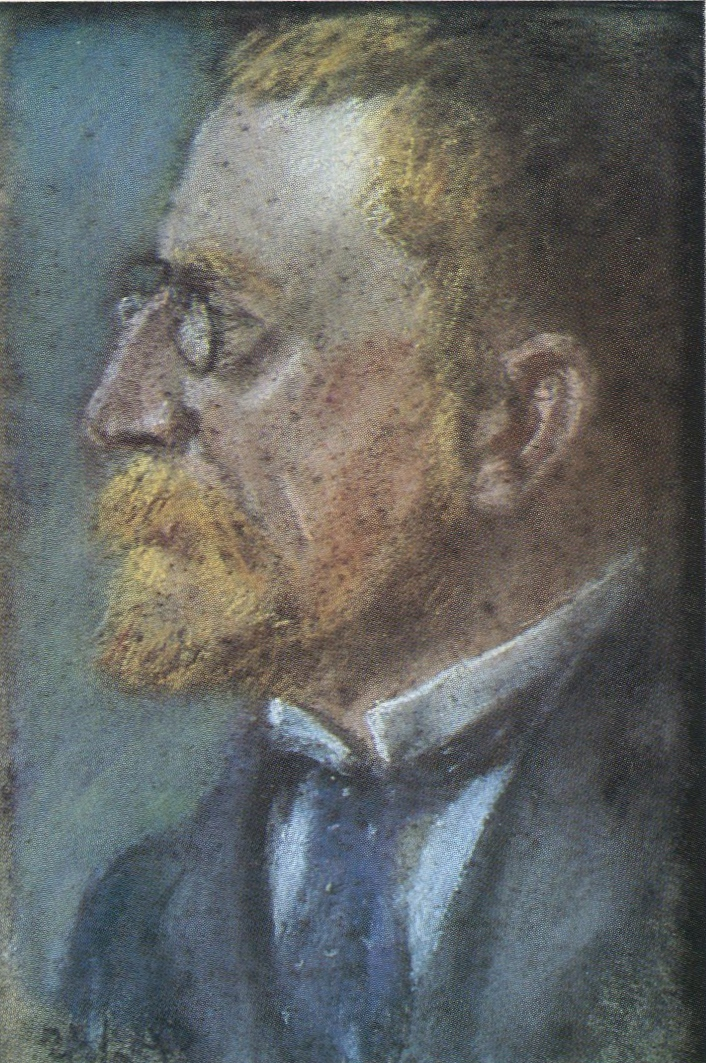
Self-portrait (1898)

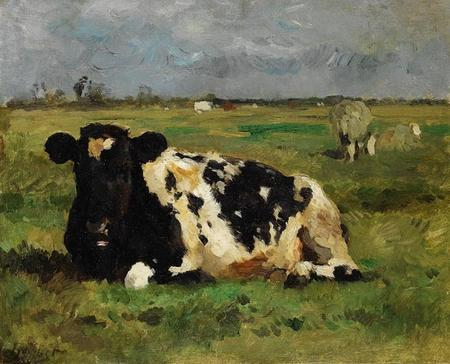
Resting Cow

Thomas Ludwig Herbst (27 July 1848 – 19 January 1915) was a German Impressionist painter known mostly for landscapes and animal portraits.

== Biography ==
He was born in Hamburg. He took his first lessons in 1865 with Jakob Becker at the Städelsches Kunstinstitut in Frankfurt. The following year, he transferred to the Prussian Academy of Arts in Berlin, where he worked with Carl Steffeck. In 1868, he transferred again, this time to the Weimar Saxon Grand Ducal Art School, where he took advanced studies with Charles Verlat.

From 1873 to 1876, he lived in Düsseldorf and took several trips to the Netherlands. He then spent a year in Paris with his friend, Max Liebermann, before moving to Munich, where he came into contact with the Munich Secession and Wilhelm Leibl.

In 1884, he returned to Hamburg and became a drawing teacher at the "Vocational School for Women". More training followed in 1890, with the landscape painter, Carl Rodeck. In 1897, he became one of the founding members of the Hamburgischer Künstlerklub but, according to Arthur Siebelist, resigned in 1903 because he did not like their "cultural standards".

In 1906, he went on an extended study trip to Holstein with Friedrich Ahlers-Hestermann. In later years, he acquired the nickname "Kuhherbst" (Kuh means Cow), in reference to one of his favorite subjects.

In 2015, on the centennial of his death, the Jenisch House in Hamburg held a major retrospective of his works.
