= Friedrich Ahlers-Hestermann =

German painter and art writer (1883–1973)

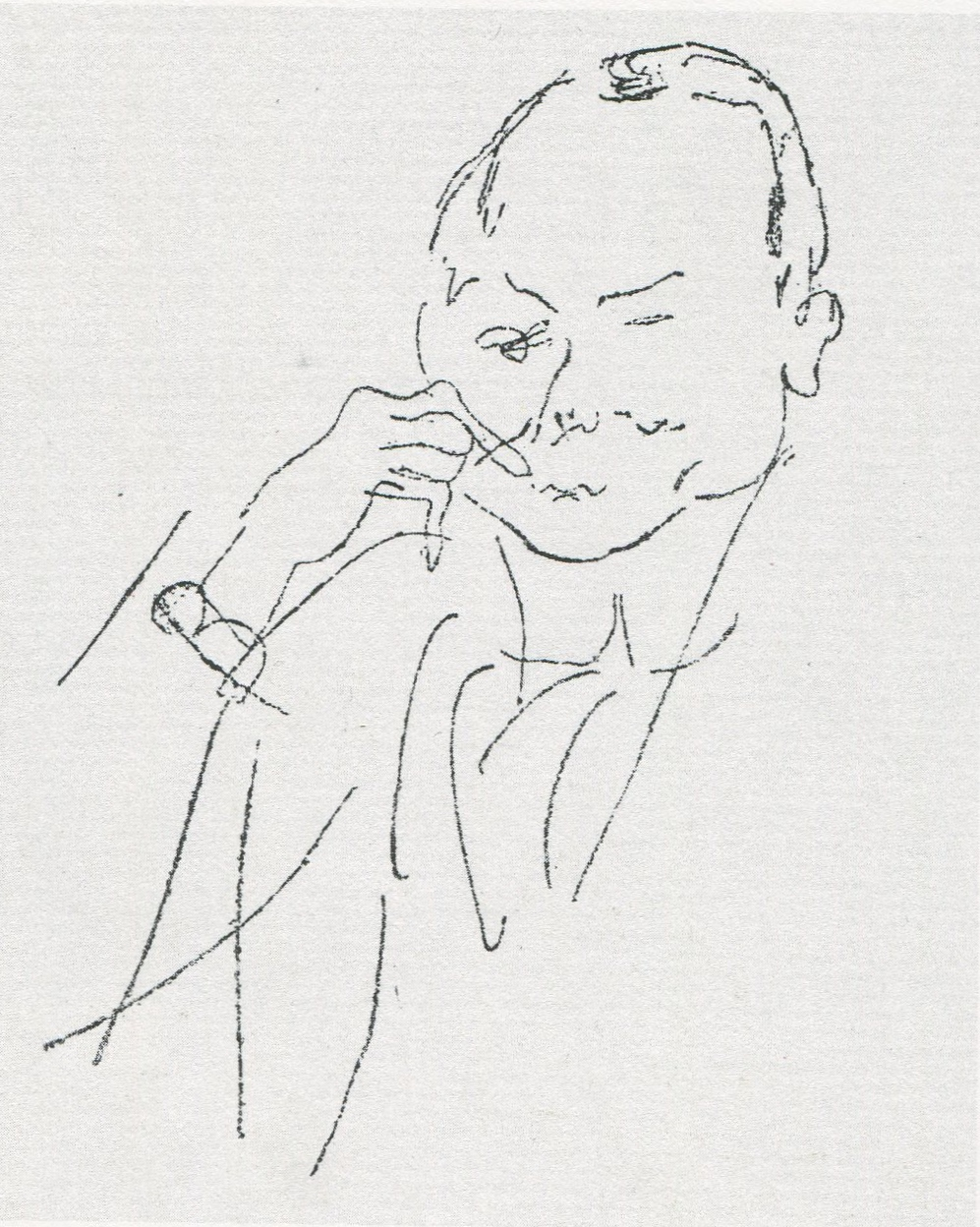
Friedrich Ahlers-Hestermann, pen drawn by Jules Pascin, 1906

Friedrich Ahlers-Hestermann (17 July 1883 – 11 December 1973) was a German painter and art writer from Hamburg. He was a member of the Hamburgische Künstlerclub of 1897, as well as of the Hamburg artist's workshop of 1832 and pupil of the Académie Matisse in Paris. In 1913, he met the Russian painter Alexandra Povorina, whom he married in 1916. After the First World War, he was a co-founder of the Hamburg Secession.
