= Alfred Lichtwark =

German art historian, museum curator, and art educator (1852–1914)

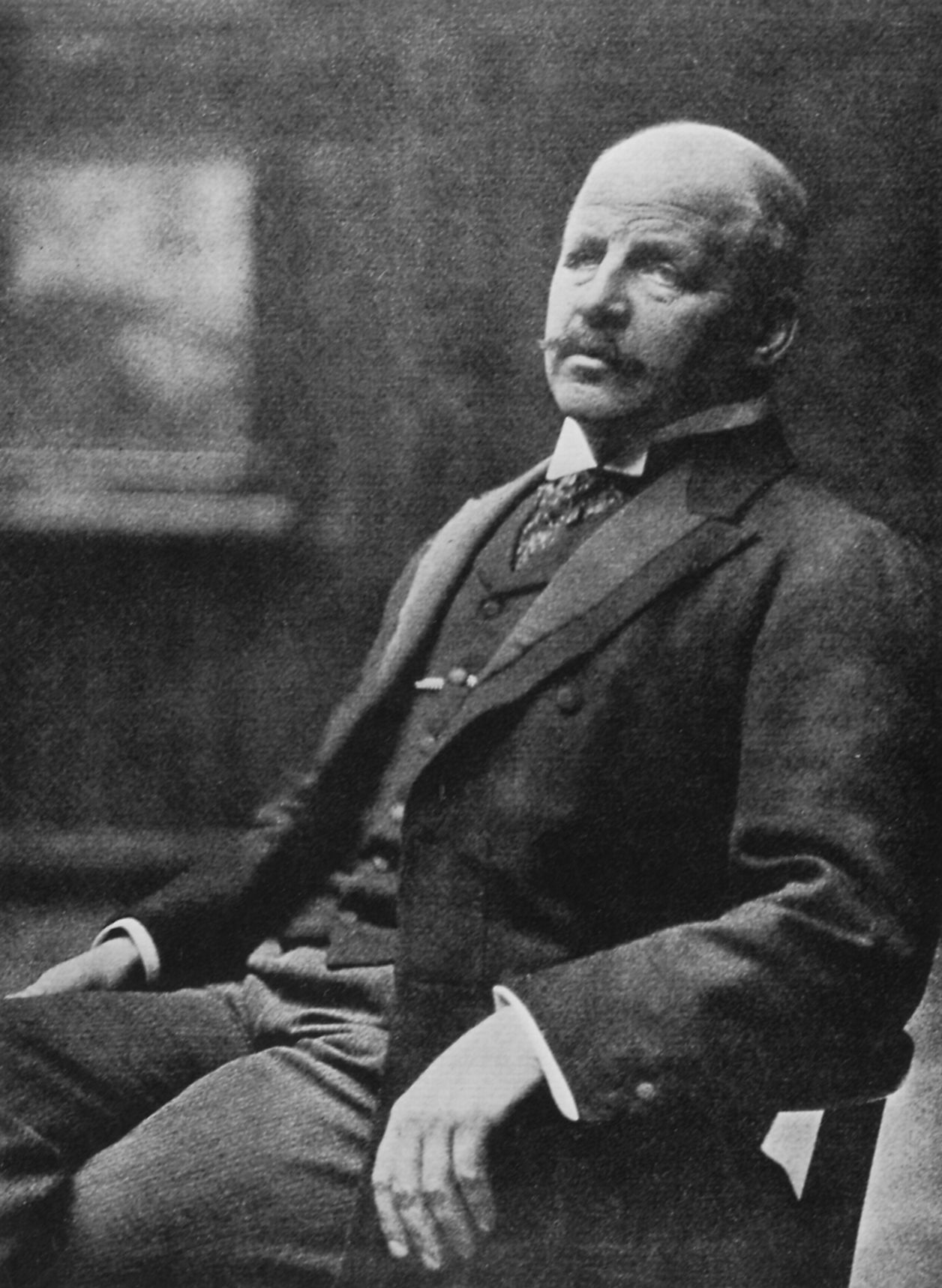
- Alfred Lichtwark in 1899. Photograph by Rudolf Dührkoop.
- Born: 14 November 1852; Hamburg-Reitbrook, Germany
- Died: 13 January 1914 (aged 61); Hamburg, Germany

Academic background
- Education: Christianeum, Altona, Hamburg, Germany

Academic work
- Main interests: Museum education, Art education

Alfred Lichtwark (14 November 1852 – 13 January 1914) was a German art historian, museum curator, and art educator in Hamburg. He is one of the founders of museum education and the art education movement.

== Background and career ==
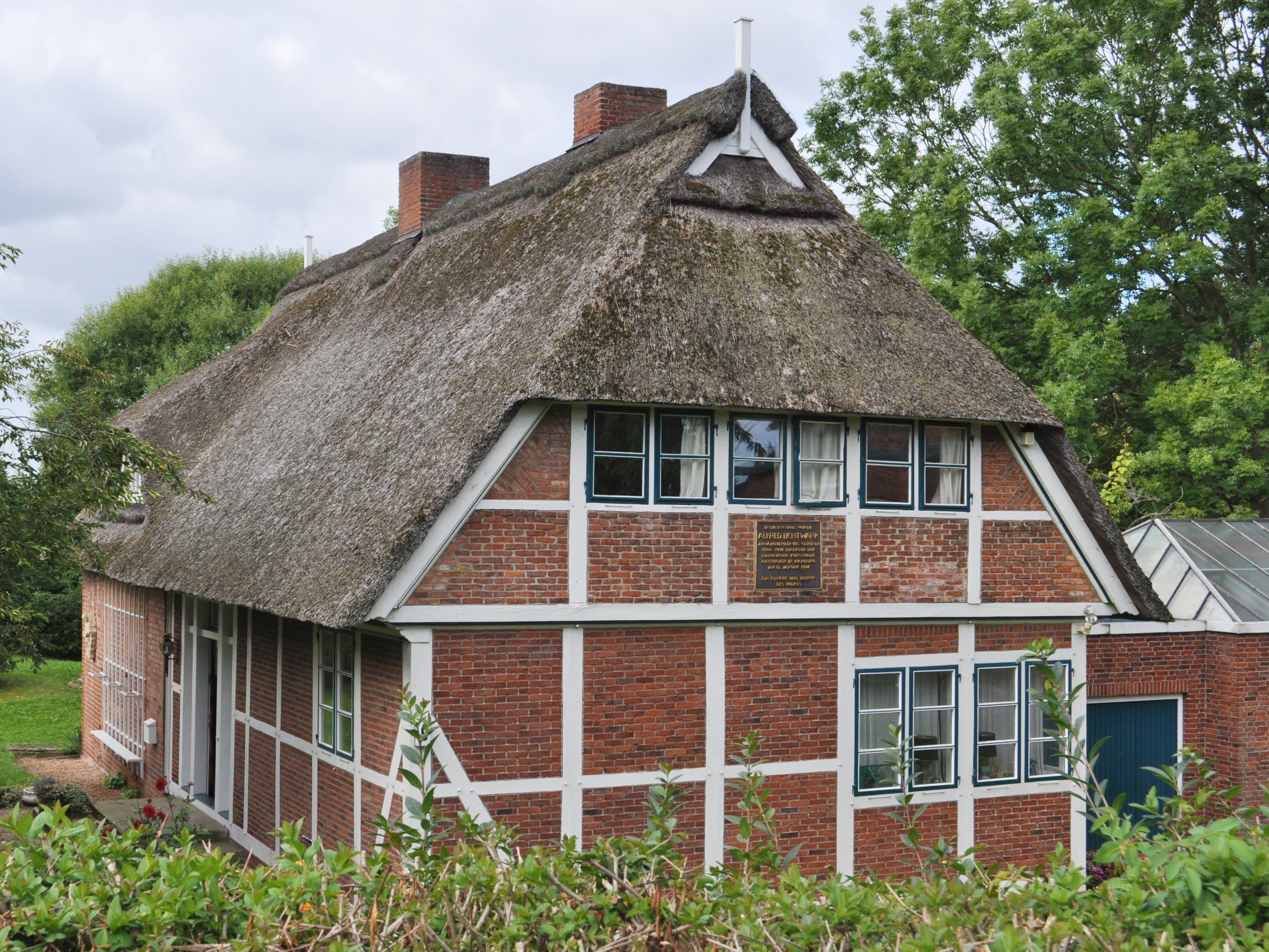
Front Dike 9, Hamburg-Reitbrook, Lichtwark's birthplace.

Alfred Lichtwark was the son of Herr Johann Karl Ernst Lichtwark, a minor lord who owned the Reitbrook Mill. From his father's first marriage he had three half-siblings. Alfred Lichtwark's mother Johanne Helene Henrietta (née Bach) (1829–1909) was believed to be a direct descendant of the composer Johann Sebastian Bach. Lichtwark had a happy childhood in the countryside with his siblings Hans and Marianne (1857–1930) until 1858, when his father was forced to sell the mill for financial reasons. The family moved to Hamburg, where his father ran an inn which fared poorly, and the family lived in poverty. Lichtwark, who attended the civil school, proved to be very talented and versatile, helping students after school as an assistant teacher. In 1873 he took the Abitur at the Christianeum in Altona. A grant by Justus Brinckmann helped finance his studies in arts and education in Dresden, Leipzig, and Berlin. After finishing his studies he worked at several primary and civil schools in Berlin. Lichtwark was very disenchanted with the educational system that existed at that time in Imperial Germany, which led him to the idea of a new kind of school or pedagogy.

== Director of the Kunsthalle Hamburg ==
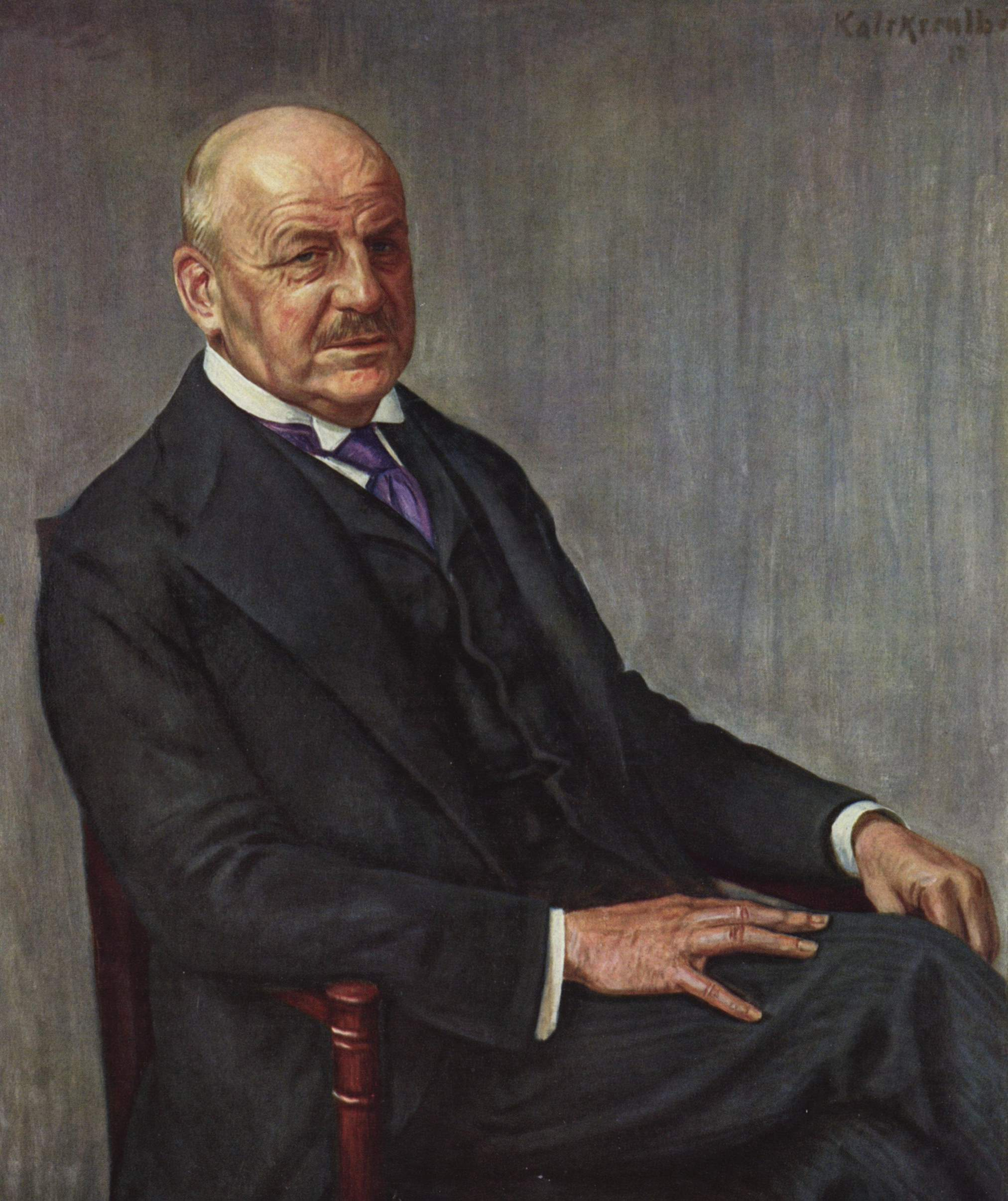
A portrait of Alfred Lichtwark, painted by Leopold Karl Walter Graf von Kalckreuth, 1912.

It is unclear why Lichtwark was asked in 1886 whether he wanted to take over as the director of the Kunsthalle Hamburg (an art museum in Hamburg), which was previously managed only by a member of the Senate. He became the first director of the Kunsthalle Hamburg on December 3, 1886, after which he systematically developed its collection. The current collection is still largely based on the foundations set by Lichtwark.

Lichtwark collected Hamburg's medieval art (especially the works of Master Bertram and Master Francke) on the one hand, and also sought and acquired works of German romantics on the other hand (Caspar David Friedrich, Philipp Otto Runge). He also collected the works of contemporary artists of the late 19th century such as Lovis Corinth, Wilhelm Leibl, Adolph Menzel, Pierre Bonnard, and Édouard Vuillard.

With the museum's busy purchasing practices and his intense public relations work, Lichtwark succeeded in broadening the understanding of the then-contemporary art. In addition to his heavy interest in French Impressionism, he advocated strongly for the Hamburg art scene. He initiated the establishment of the Hamburgischer Künstlerklub and awarded contracts to painters such as Gotthardt Kuehl and Wilhelm Trübner. His aim of creating an artistic monument for his hometown of Hamburg led to contracts with painters such as Max Liebermann and Theodor Hagen, from whom he received several harbor pictures. During his tenure Lichtwark undertook several trips to Dresden, Weimar, Frankfurt, Geneva, Paris, London, and Stockholm, where he looked for numerous art motifs. He also brought back the Grabow Altarpiece of Master Bertram, which used to be the altar of St. Peter's Church in Hamburg, from the church in Grabow back to Hamburg. This was first displayed in 1906 at the Kunsthalle Hamburg.

Lichtwark criticized the class divisions in German society and other parts of Europe during that time. His educational ideas eventually led to the founding of the Lichtwark school, an educational reform school in Hamburg-Winterhude.

He led exercises on the contemplation of works of art in which he systematically discussed his museum's artworks with students. He published the resultant findings in several papers and books. He is thus one of the founders of the field of museum education.

Alfred Lichtwark was a friend of Max Liebermann, Hans Olde, and Max Predöhl, mayor of Hamburg, and a supporter of Count Harry Kessler.

The founding and design of the Hamburg Museum, as well as art education for young children, were results of his initiative. In 1896 he opened an exhibition in the Kunsthalle Hamburg on the topic of how children think and paint.

Lichtwark remained the director of the Kunsthalle Hamburg until his death in 1914. He died of stomach cancer and was buried in the Old Hamburg Memorial Cemetery, part of the Ohlsdorf Cemetery. His successor at the museum was Gustav Pauli.

== Lichtwark Prize ==
The Lichtwark Prize was started in 1951 by the Senate of the Free and Hanseatic City of Hamburg on the occasion of the 100th birthday of Alfred Lichtwark. It is awarded every five years to a painter, draftsman, sculptor, or other artist whose works have produced a significant impact in the world of visual arts.

== Honors ==
The following are named after Alfred Lichtwark:

- Lichtwarkstraße (Lichtwark street) in Eppendorf.
- The modern Heinrich Hertz School in Hamburg-Winterhude was called the Lichtwarkschule during 1920–1937 (in 1937 it merged with the Heinrich-Hertz-Realgymnasium to form the Oberschule am Stadtpark für Jungen). The school's most famous graduate is the former Chancellor Helmut Schmidt.
- The Lichtwark-Heft, a cultural magazine that has been published since 1948 – initially monthly, and now annually, published by Verlag HB-Werbung, Hamburg-Bergedorf, ISSN 1862-3549.
- The Lichtwark Bergedorf Haus im Park, a theater organization in Bergedorf.
- The Lichtwarkhaus, a youth house in Bergedorf.

== Quotations ==
- Wir wollen nicht ein Museum, das dasteht und wartet, sondern ein Institut, das thätig in die künstlerische Erziehung unserer Bevölkerung eingreift (We do not want a museum that stands there and waits, but an institution that gets actively involved in the artistic education of our people).
- Freie und Abrissstadt Hamburg (Free and demolition city of Hamburg, a play on the title "Free and Hanseatic city of Hamburg). Often quoted on architects' forums, this quote referred to plans for the demolition of workers' dwellings on the docks in order to build the Speicherstadt warehouse district.
- Es gibt in unserem Zeitalter kein Kunstwerk, das so aufmerksam betrachtet würde wie die Bildnisfotografie des eigenen Selbst, der nächsten Verwandten und Freunde, der Geliebten (There is no work of art in our age which is viewed as attentively as the photographic portrait of oneself, of the closest relatives and friends, of the beloved).
- Aller Fortschritt besteht darin, daß einzelne einen höheren Typus vorleben und die Massen ihnen nachstreben. (All progress is due to the higher example set by individuals; the masses then strive to follow).
- Die Erfahrung lehrt, dass, wer auf irgendeinem Gebiet zu sammeln anfängt, eine Wandlung in seiner Seele anheben spürt. Er wird ein freudiger Mensch, den eine tiefere Teilnahme erfüllt, und ein offeneres Verständnis für die Dinge dieser Welt bewegt seine Seele. (Experience teaches that anyone who begins to collect in any field can feel a change in his soul. He becomes a joyful man filled with a deeper empathy, and a more open understanding of worldly things moves his soul.) (Der Sammler (The Collector), 1912)

== Works ==
- Die Bedeutung der Amateur-Photographie (The importance of amateur photography), Halle a S.: Knapp, 1894
- Hans Holbeins Bilder des Todes : reproducirt nach den Probedrucken und der Lyonner Ausgabe von 1547 in der Kunsthalle zu Hamburg (Hans Holbein's images of death: Reproduced from the proofs and the Lyon edition of 1547 in the Kunsthalle Hamburg). Commeter. Hamburg 1897 (online edition)
- Hamburg-Niedersachsen (Hamburg Lower Saxony). Dresden 1897 (online edition)
- Die Seele als Kunstwerk (The soul as a work of art). Böcklin studies. Berlin 1899. (online edition)
- Julius Oldach (Julius Oldach). Hamburg 1899. (online edition)
- Meister Francke (Master Francke). Hamburg 1899. (online edition)
- Übungen in der Betrachtung von Kunstwerken. Nach Versuchen mit einer Schulklasse. (Exercises in contemplation of works of art. After experiments with a school class.) Dresden 1900. (online edition)
- Drei Programme (Three programs). (Basics of artistic education, Vol 4). Berlin 1902 (online edition)
- Aus der Praxis (From practice). (Basics of artistic education, Vol 5). Berlin 1902 (online edition)
- Vom Arbeitsfeld des Dilettantismus (From the field of work of dilettantism). Vol 13. Berlin 1902 (online edition)
- Park- und Gartenstudien : die Probleme des Hamburger Stadtparks, der Heidegarten (Park and garden studies: The problems of the Hamburg City Park, the heath garden). Berlin: Cassirer, 1909 (online edition at the Düsseldorf University and State Library)
