= Hans Werner Schmidt =

German painter, illustrator and etcher

- Born: October 6, 1859; Free and Hanseatic City of Hamburg
- Died: May 31, 1950 (aged 90); Weimar, West Germany
- Known for: Paintings, illustrations, etchings
- Movement: History painting

Hans Werner Schmidt (October 6, 1859 – May 31, 1950) was a German painter, illustrator and etcher. Primarily, he created history paintings, frequently dealing with the history of Weimar and the life of Johann Wolfgang von Goethe.

Grown up as the son of a craftsman, Schmidt began studying at the Weimar Saxon Grand Ducal Art School in 1879. As a student of Albert Heinrich Brendel and Theodor Hagen he became a master student in 1885 and was appointed professor in 1903.
