= Emil Zschimmer =

German painter

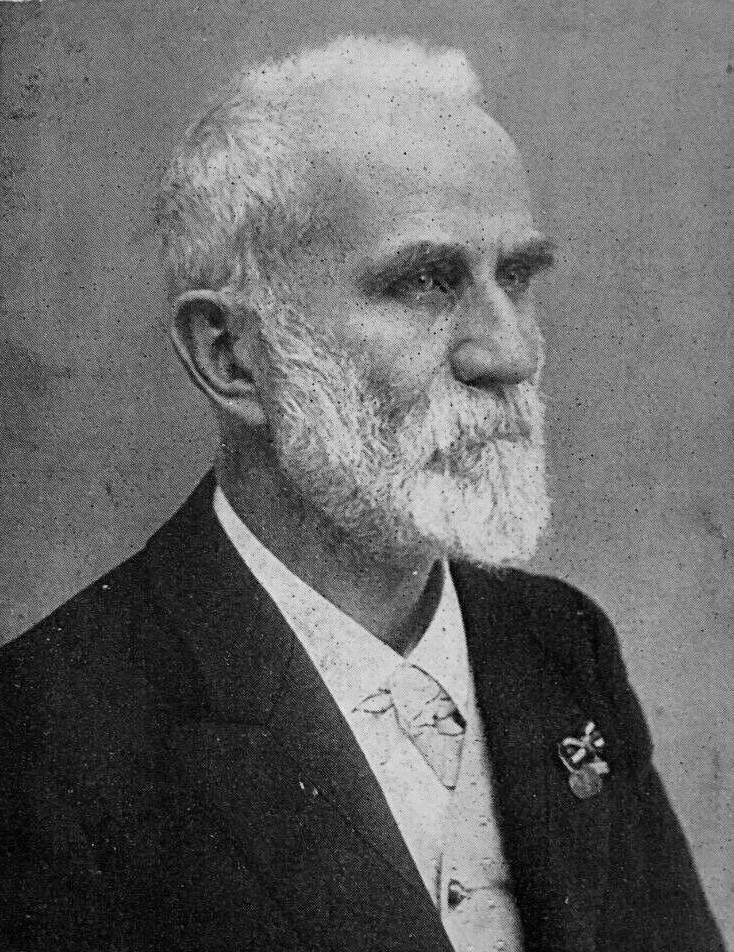
Emil Zschimmer (1912)

Emil Zschimmer (14 September 1842, Bad Schmiedeberg - 23 January 1917, Bad Schmiedeberg) was a German painter and art teacher.

== Life and work ==
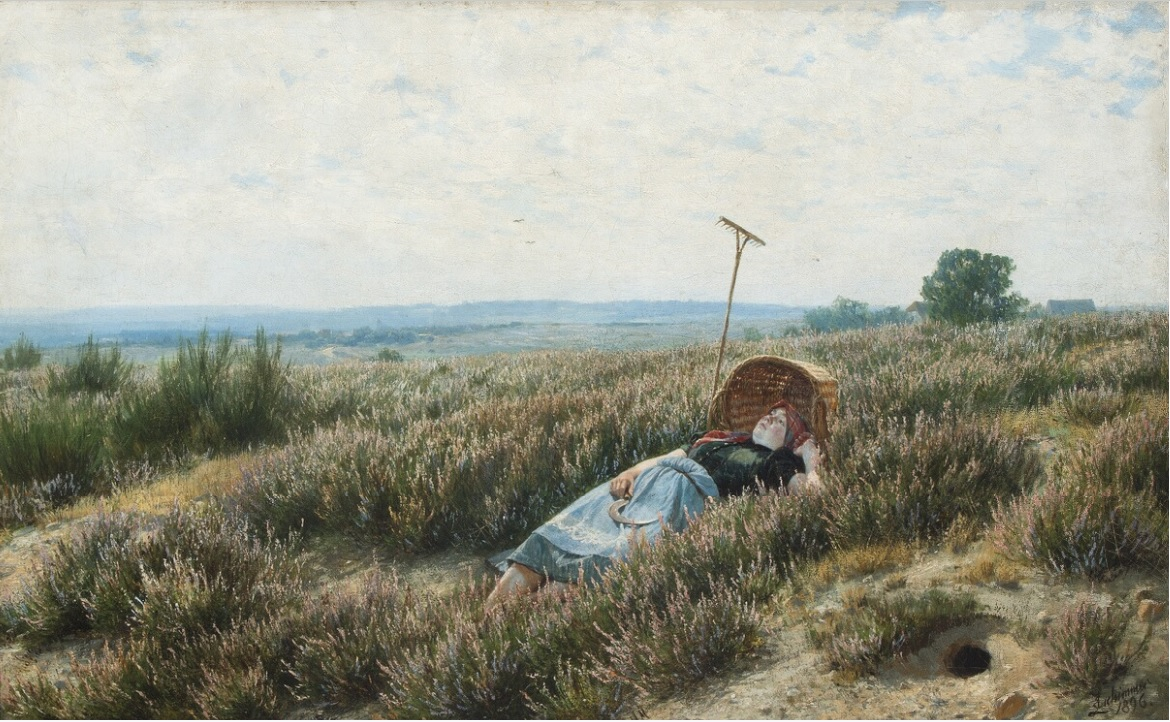
A Woman Resting in the Heather

Many of his ancestors worked in the forest service. He was born to Lord of the manor, Johann August Zschimmer, and his wife, Auguste Henriette née Baentsch. After primary school, from 1853 to 1859, he attended a Realschule, operated by the Francke Foundations, in Halle. He then learned the craft of pattern making, at a calico factory in Eilenburg. It was there that his talent for art was discovered. He completed his training in 1863, then went to study at the Grand-Ducal Saxon Art School, Weimar, with Arthur von Ramberg, Ferdinand Pauwels and Alexander Michelis. His studies were briefly interrupted by service in the Franco-Prussian War, and he graduated in 1872.

That same year, he achieved his first artistic success when his painting, "Im Hochwalde", was awarded a prize at an Academy art exhibition in Berlin. In 1875, he was employed as a teacher at the Weimar Princely Free Drawing School. Later, from 1882 to 1891, he was a teacher of free-hand drawing at his alma mater, the Grand-Ducal School. During this time, he also taught at the Königliches Gymnasium (Royal High School) in Erfurt. In 1890, he was awarded the title of Professor by Charles Alexander, Grand Duke of Saxe-Weimar-Eisenach.

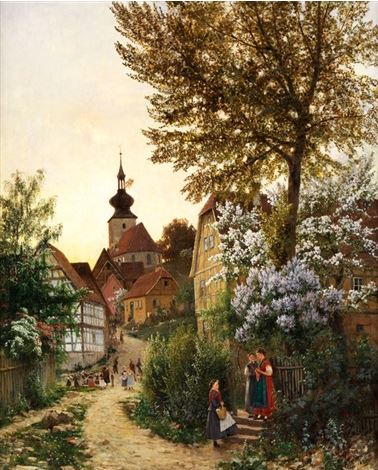
A May Evening in Erfurt

He retired from all of his teaching positions in 1891 and returned to Bad Schmiedeberg, where he and his wife, Cäcilie, retired to a villa he had recently built. There, he painted hundreds of views of the Düben Heath, many with staffage. Most of them are now in private collections. In addition to painting, he did some wood carving; notably a crucifix for the local Protestant church.

His daughter, Erica, also became an artist. Both of his sons died in World War I. He was buried in the local cemetery, and his grave is still being maintained. A street in Bad Schmiedeberg was named in his honor in 1990.
