= Franz Gustav Arndt =

German landscape and genre painter

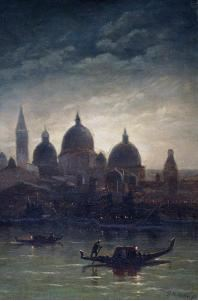
Venice by Moonlight

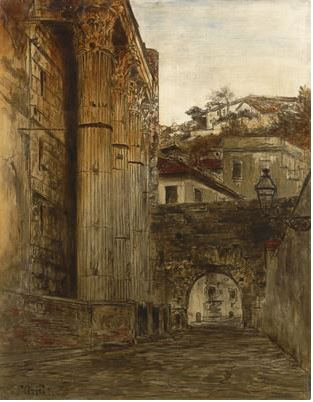
Italian Temple Complex

Franz Gustav Arndt (20 August 1842 – 13 March 1905) was a German landscape and genre painter.

== Biography ==
He was born in Lobsens, where his father, Gustav Wilhelm Arndt, was the District Judge. His brother, Wilhelm Arndt, became a noted historian and palaeographer.

He studied at the Grand-Ducal Saxon Art School, Weimar, under Alexander Michelis and Theodor Hagen. In 1876, he became a Professor of landscape painting there and, from 1879 to 1881, he served as Secretary of the Art School. He was also a member of the Weimar "Society for Etchings".

From 1872 to 1877, he made several study trips to Italy. In 1884, he quit his positions at the school and moved to Berlin. Three years later, he moved again, to Blasewitz, near Dresden.

There is a painting by Arndt in the Liszt-Haus Weimar which may depict Liszt at the Sphinxgrotte in the Park an der Ilm, which was one of Liszt's favorite places in Weimar. But it means a scene of Liszt's Consolations. He is also known for "The Four Seasons", created in conjunction with Hieronymus Christian Krohn, in the dining room of the noted art collector, Eduard Friedrich Weber, completed in 1877.

Arndt died in 1905 in Blasewitz.
