= Mathilde Freiin von Freytag-Loringhoven =

German artist (1860–1941)

- Freytag-Loringhoven c. 1920
- Born: 30 October 1860; Copenhagen, Denmark
- Died: 30 August 1941 (aged 80); Weimar, Germany
- Known for: Painting, Art criticism

Mathilde Freiin von Freytag-Loringhoven (1860–1941) was a German artist and critic.

== Biography ==
Freytag-Loringhoven was born on 30 October 1860 in Copenhagen, Denmark. She was a student of Karl Buchholz, Ludwig von Gleichen-Rußwurm, Leopold Graf von Kalckreuth, Wilhelm August Stryowski, and Max Thedy. She studied at the Grand-Ducal Saxon Art School. She exhibited her paintings in several group exhibitions. Settling in Weimar, Germany Freytag-Loringhoven became a lecturer at the Grand-Ducal Saxon Art School and also served on the Weimar municipal council.

Freytag-Loringhoven was the culture critic for the Weimarer Landeszeitung. She used this platform to advocate for the impressionistic style of painting that was common at that time, and to criticize the new avant-garde art, including the Bauhaus movement.

Freytag-Loringhoven was interested in animal intelligence. She was a member of the Tierschutzverein Weimar eV (Animal Welfare Association of Weimar) and served on the board of the Gesellschaft für Tierpsychologie (Society for Animal Psychology) in Stuttgart.

She died on 30 August 1941 in Weimar, Germany.

== Gallery ==
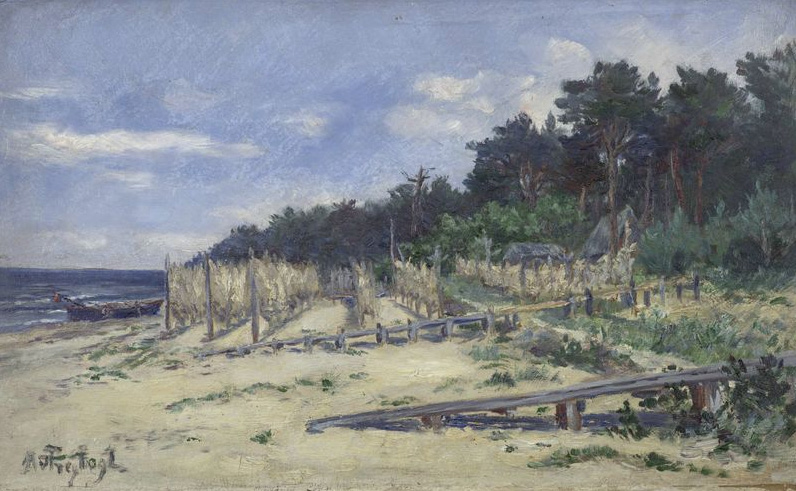
Fishing nets on the Baltic beach

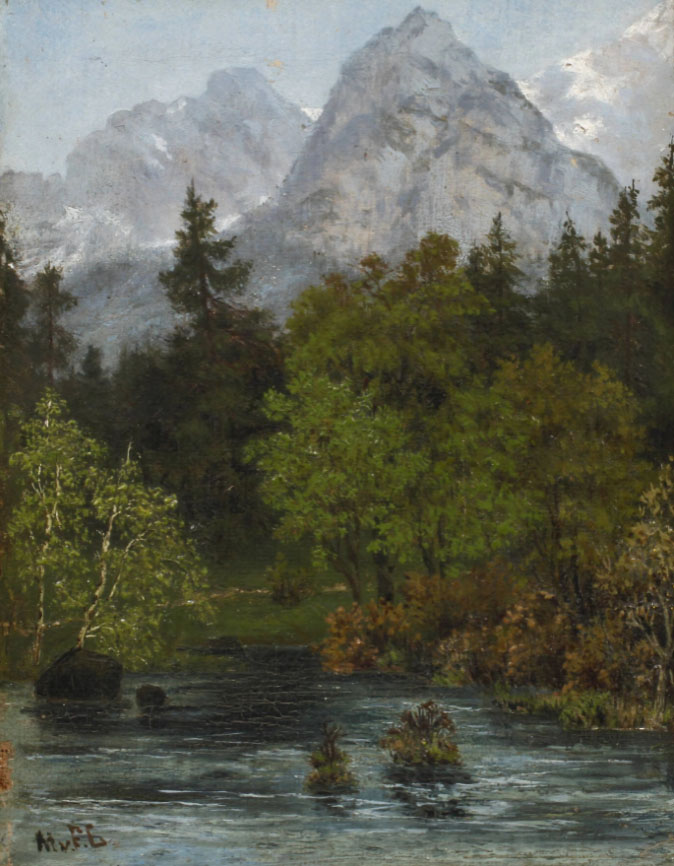
At the lake
