= Eduard Weichberger =

German painter

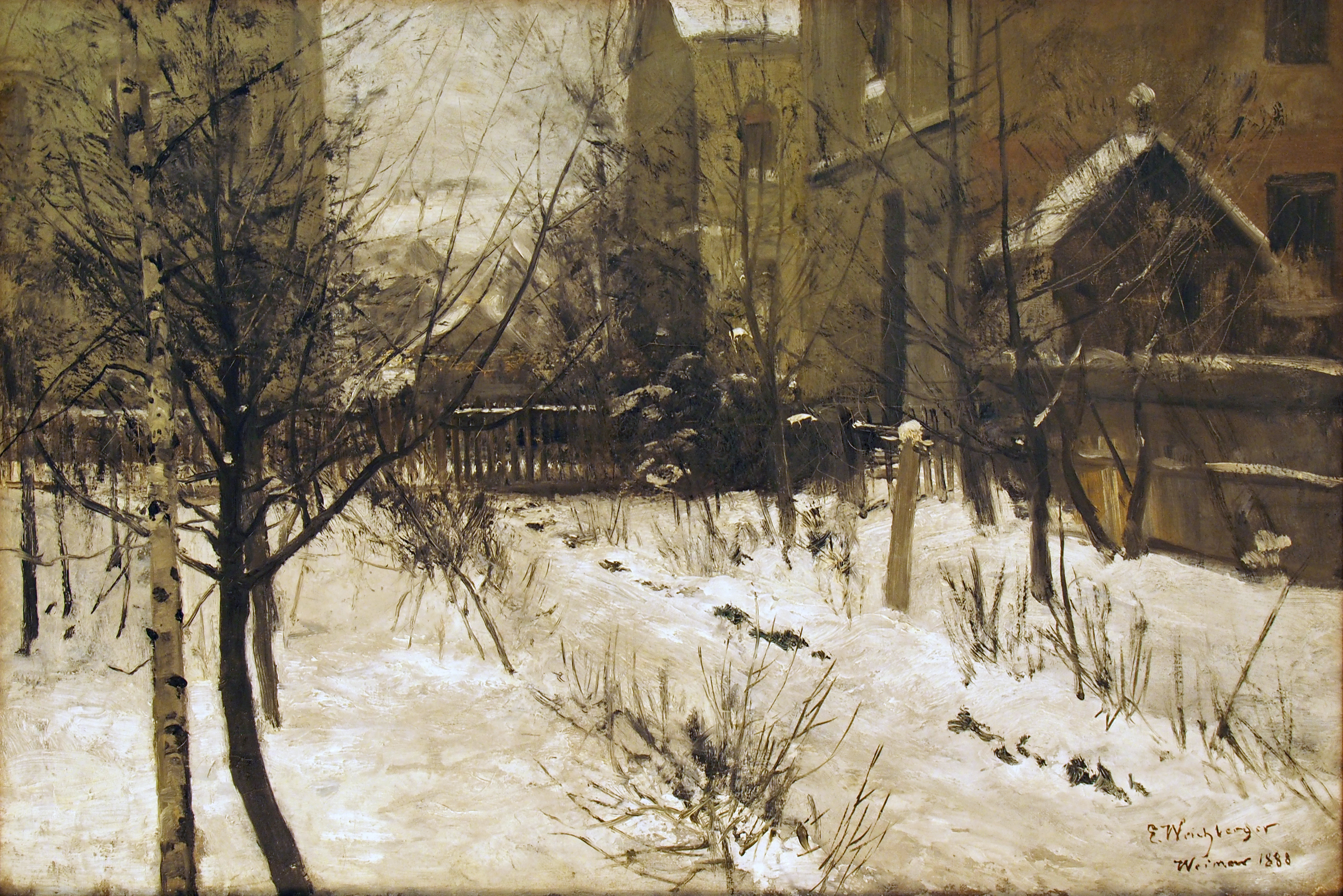
Courtyard in Winter

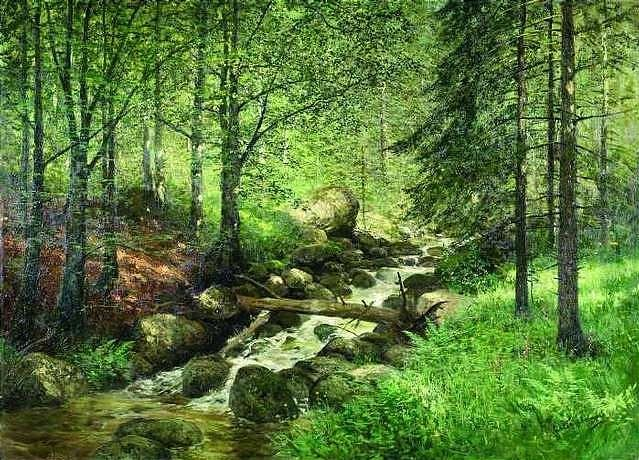
Forest Interior with Boulder-Lined Brook

Alexander Heinrich Wilhelm Eduard Weichberger (5 March 1843, Krauthausen - 19 August 1913, Weimar) was a German painter who specialized in forest landscapes and rural scenes.

== Biography ==
He was the sixth child of First Lieutenant and manorial owner Alexander Weichberger and his wife, Amalie. In 1848, the family moved from Krauthausen to Eisenach.

From 1860 to 1861, he attended the Polytechnische Schule in Dresden (now the Technical University of Dresden), where he studied architecture. This was apparently not to his liking as, after only one semester, he left to enroll at the Grand-Ducal Saxon Art School, Weimar. Until 1862, he studied with Arnold Böcklin and Franz von Lenbach then, until 1868, with Alexander Michelis and, finally, with Max Schmidt. His formal studies were interspersed with study trips to Italy and the Baltic Seacoast.

In 1876, he married Elise Choinanus, from a family of musicians, who was twelve years his junior. They had four children, including the writer, Konrad Weichberger. From 1877 to 1906, he worked as a free-lance artist, creating paintings and folia of etchings. He also gave occasional drawing lessons. After 1899, he served as a Professor at the Art School in Weimar. He created his initial sketches with brush and paint, focusing on motifs from the Thuringian Forest, Rügen and the Tirol. Many of his sketchbooks and drawings are at the Klassik Stiftung Weimar.

He died of a heart attack in 1913, at the age of seventy.

== Sources ==
- Petra Dietzel (Ed.): Festschrift zum 300-jährigen Kirchenjubiläum der Kirche zu Krauthausen 1709–2009 (Kirchgemeinde Krauthausen), 2009.
- (in German) Eduard Weichberger. In: Ulrich Thieme, Felix Becker (editors): Allgemeines Lexikon der Bildenden Künstler von der Antike bis zur Gegenwart. Band 35, E. A. Seemann, Leipzig 1942, S. 261.
