= Carl Arp =

German landscape painter

- Born: January 3, 1867; Kiel, Germany
- Died: January 6, 1913 (aged 46); Jena, Germany
- Education: Weimar Saxon-Grand Ducal Art School (under Theodor Hagen and Leopold von Kalckreuth)
- Known for: En plein air landscape painting; co-founding Schleswig-Holsteinische Kunstgenossenschaft
- Movement: En plein air
- Spouse: Marta Rethwisch (m. 1895)

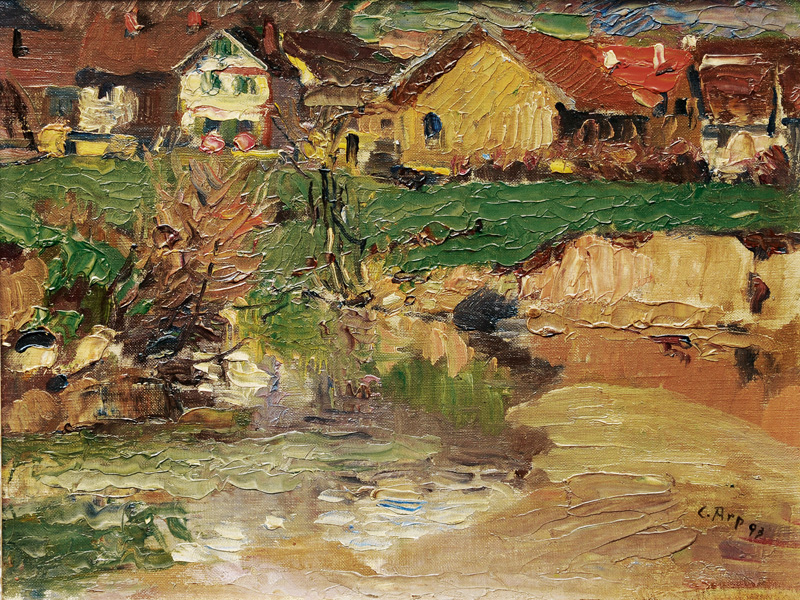
Village on the Water (1893)

Carl Arp (3 January 1867 – 6 January 1913) was a German landscape painter born in Kiel. He taught in Weimar and had exhibitions in Munich, Berlin, Kiel, Jena and Düsseldorf. He is best known as a founding member of the Schleswig-Holsteinische Kunstgenossenschaft and representative of the Weimar Saxon-Grand Ducal Art School (Grossherzoglich-Sächsische Kunstschule Weimar). Subsequent to his studies there under Theodor Hagen and Leopold von Kalckreuth, he spent several years in Italy. Carl Arp is viewed as one of the main representatives of the "en plein air" style of landscape painting.

== Painting technique and controversy ==
Carl Arp’s work (and that of his colleague Christian Rohlfs) caused controversy. During several exhibitions in the Kieler Kunsthalle (1891 to 1894) and the Münchner Glaspalast (Munich Crystal Palace, 1892) the innovative, thick, pasted form of paint application in some of his works were criticized by conservatives for appearing "almost like a relief". In 1894, some of his paintings were removed, on the orders of the grand duke Carl Alexander, from the permanent exhibition in Weimar. It was not the motifs of the paintings that caused controversy but the avant-garde technique of using spatulas rather than brushes to manipulate paint—pasted in thick layers on canvas or board. The Weimar Malerschule professorial college, which had approved Arp’s contributions to the Weimar permanent exhibition, and fellow artists vehemently protested that removal. However, the collegiate's formal protest was not relayed by the exhibition director, Count Görtz. In a meeting convened on 17 January 1894, Professor Max Thedy petitioned that this censorship be reviewed but Görtz responded that he had discussed the matter with the grand duke and that "further deliberations will be unnecessary".

Arp promptly declared his exit from the Weimar school and withdrew to Kiel, where he co-founded the artist cooperative "Schleswig-Holsteinische Kunstgenossenschaft". In 1895, he married the teacher Marta Rethwisch and the young couple spent the subsequent years in Venice and Taormina (Sicily) before returning to Kiel in 1898. Despite the conservative social and cultural attitudes in Wilhelmian era Germany, which included direct condemnation of modern art as 'degenerate' by the last Kaiser in his 18 December 1901 Rinnsteinrede ('gutter speech'), works by Carl Arp continued to be presented in Berlin, Kiel and Munich exhibitions. Further exhibitions, supported by Anglo-German count and patron of avant-garde art Harry Graf Kessler in Weimar followed. In 1906 Carl Arp presented works together with Fritz Overbeck and Käthe Kollwitz in Jena; 1907 in Munich and Düsseldorf. Upon returning to the Weimar Art School in 1906, he met his nephew Jean Arp there, co-founder of the avant-garde art movement Dadaism, but resigned from the school again in 1907. Carl Arp died (at age 46) in Jena on 6 January 1913 from complications resulting from stomach surgery.

Arp's works are exhibited in museums in Kiel, Danzig und Weimar but many are held in private collections.

Arp's works are mostly oil or water colour paintings with motives from Schleswig-Holstein and the Kieler Förde, as well as his time in southern Germany and Italy. Examples include:

- An den Schleusen / At the Sluice Gates, oil on board, 75 cm x 54 cm
- Giardino Pubblico, Venedig / Public Gardens, Venice, oil on board, 31 cm x 24 cm
- Matterhorn / Monte Cervino, oil on board, 16.5 cm x 21.5 cm

== See also ==
- List of German painters
