= Julius Victor Carstens =

German painter

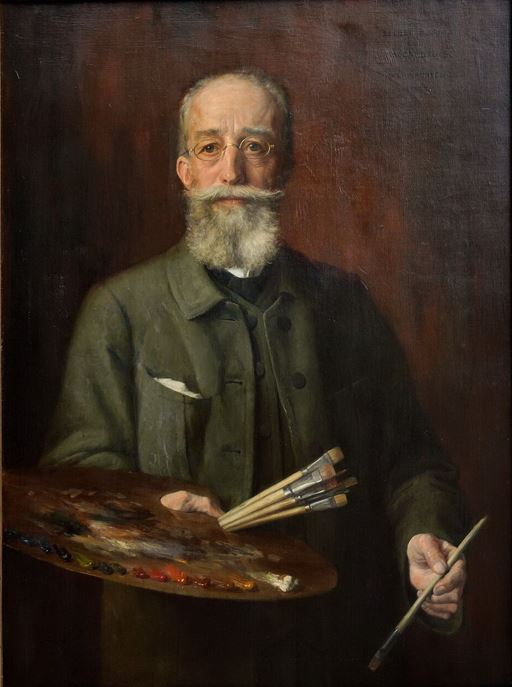
Self-portrait (1907)

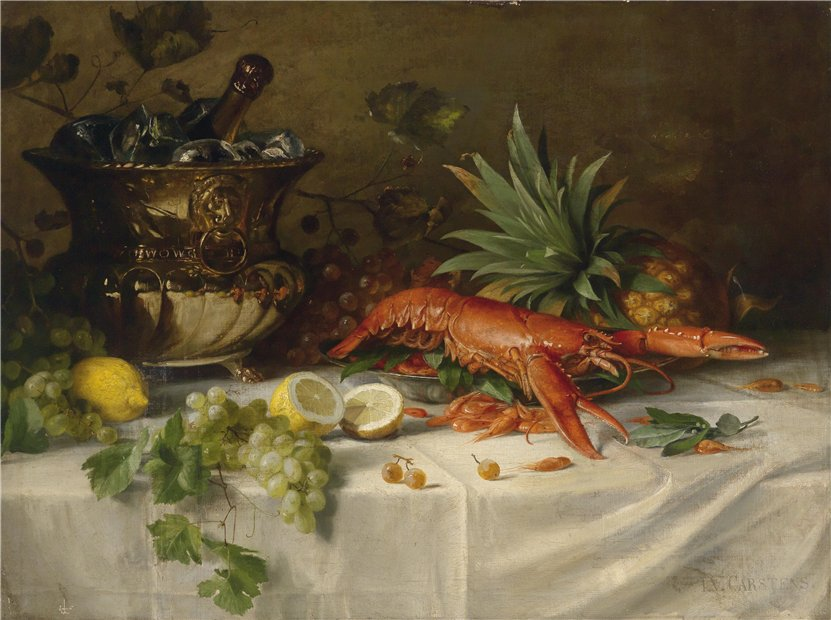
Still-life with Lobster

Julius Victor Carstens (29 November 1849 – 15 November 1908) was a German painter. He worked in a variety of genres; including portraits, landscapes and still-lifes. He also painted a few church interiors.

== Life and work ==
He was born in Nusse. His father, Joachim Hermann Carstens, was a doctor. He came from a long line of professionals, established by the jurist, Joachim Carstens in the 17th century.

He studied at the Grand-Ducal Saxon Art School, Weimar, with the genre painter Paul Thumann and the history painter Ferdinand Pauwels, after which he made study trips to Belgium and the Netherlands. Later, he was attracted to the growing art scene in Munich, and decided to settle there; having several showings at the Glaspalast and becoming a member of the Künstlergesellschaft Allotria, where he became an associate of Franz von Lenbach and other painters who supported the traditional artistic styles. He always remained aloof from the Secession. Occasionally, he exhibited with the Berliner Kunstausstellung.

He died in Pasing in 1908. His works are mostly Classical in tone and his still-lifes were generally his most popular works.

== Sources ==
- Carstens, Julius Victor. In: Ulrich Thieme (Ed.): Allgemeines Lexikon der Bildenden Künstler von der Antike bis zur Gegenwart. Vol.6: Carlini–Cioci. E. A. Seemann, Leipzig 1912 (Online)
- Emmanuel Bénézit: Dictionary of Artists. Band 3: Bülow–Cossin. pg.302 (Online).
- Allgemeines Künstlerlexikon. Die Bildenden Künstler aller Zeiten und Völker. Band 16: Campagne–Cartellier. Saur, München u. a. 1997, ISBN 3-598-22756-6, S. 629.
- Illustrierter Katalog der Münchner Jahresausstellung von Kunstwerken aller Nationen im Königlichen Glaspalast. Verlag Franz Hanfstängl, 1894.
- Wulf Schadendorf: Museum Behnhaus. Das Haus und seine Räume. Malerei, Skulptur, Kunsthandwerk (Lübecker Museumskataloge 3) Museum für Kunst u. Kulturgeschichte d. Hansestadt, Lübeck 1976, S. 48.
