= Haake =

Haake is a surname. Notable people with the surname include:

- August Haake (1889–1915), German landscape painter
- Garrett Haake (born 1984 or 1985), American journalist
- Heinrich Haake (1892–1945), German politician
- Manfred Haake (born 1943), German rower
- Mary Jane Haake (born 1951), American tattoo artist
- Steve Haake, British professor of sports engineering
- Tomas Haake (born 1971), Swedish musician
