= Crodel =

Crodel is a surname. Notable people with the name include:

- Charles Crodel (1894–1973), French-born German painter and stained glass artist
- Paul Eduard Crodel (1862–1928), German landscape painter
