= Rudolf Höckner =

German painter

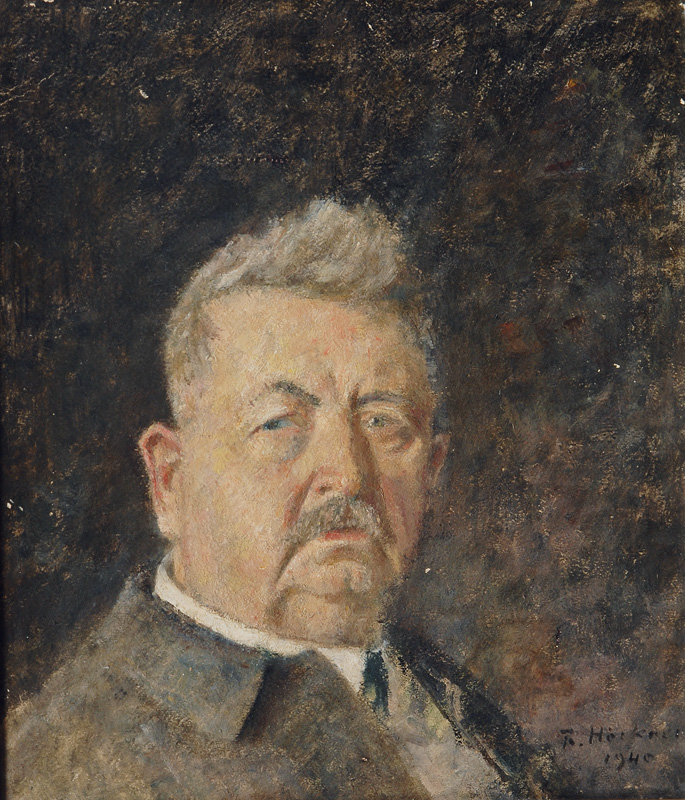
Self-portrait (1940)

Rudolf Höckner (28 July 1864 – 22 April 1942) was a German Impressionist landscape and cityscape painter.

== Biography ==
His parents were landowners and he was born on their estate near Wolkenstein. After the early death of his father in 1872, his family moved to Freiberg then, five years later, to Leipzig. There, he attended St. Thomas School, a liberal arts boarding school founded in the 13th century. He graduated in 1885.

Following that, he initially studied theology at the University of Tübingen, then was briefly enrolled at the University of Leipzig. After deciding on a career in art, he attended the Grand-Ducal Saxon Art School, Weimar, where his primary instructor was Theodor Hagen. He graduated in 1890, with a scholarship that enabled him to take study trips to Southern Germany and Italy.

In 1891, he returned to Weimar, married Brigitte Ebsen, and became a free-lance artist. In 1895, financial difficulties forced him to move to Flensburg where he supplemented his artistic income by working as a sailing correspondent for the Nord-Ostsee-Zeitung. In 1905, he moved his family again; this time to Hamburg to work as a local affairs editor for the Hamburger Nachrichten. Two years later, he gave that up to make another attempt at being a free-lance artist; holding exhibits in Hamburg and Altona.

In 1915, he and Brigitte finally settled in Wedel, on the Elbe, and remained there until her death in 1941. On the occasion of his 65th birthday, he was named an honorary member of the Altona Artists' Association and, at the age of 75, became an honorary citizen of Wedel. After his wife's death, he moved to Southern Germany and died in the spa town of Bad Mergentheim.

More than 250 of his paintings are owned by the city of Wedel. Others may be seen at the Hamburger Kunsthalle and the Altonaer Museum. A collection of letters, diaries and newspaper clippings is kept at the Stadtarchiv Wedel.

== Selected paintings ==
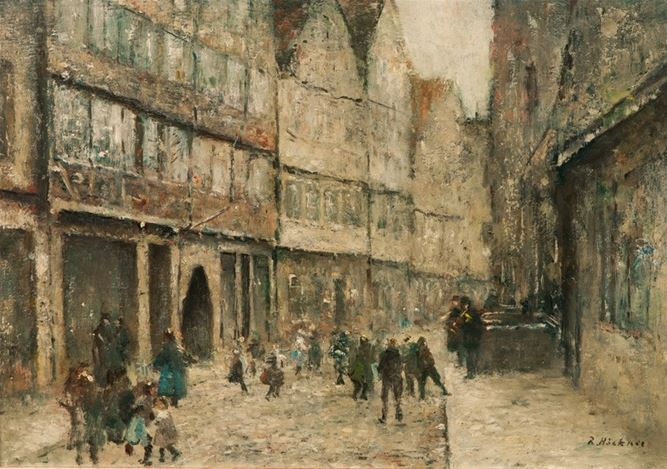
Street Scene with Children and Musicians

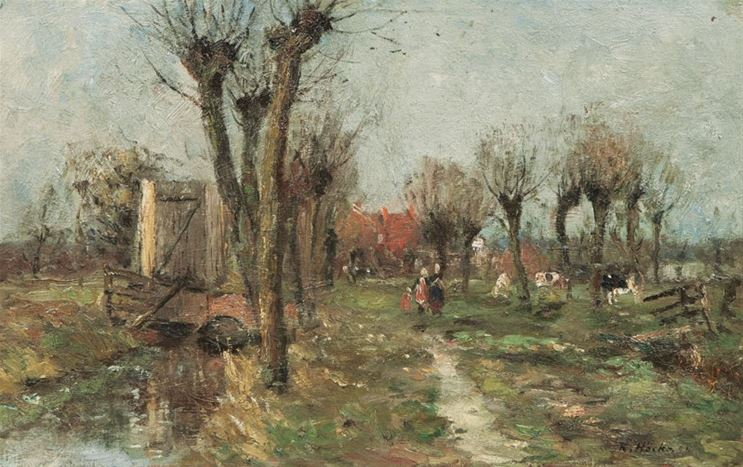
Landscape Near Altenwerder

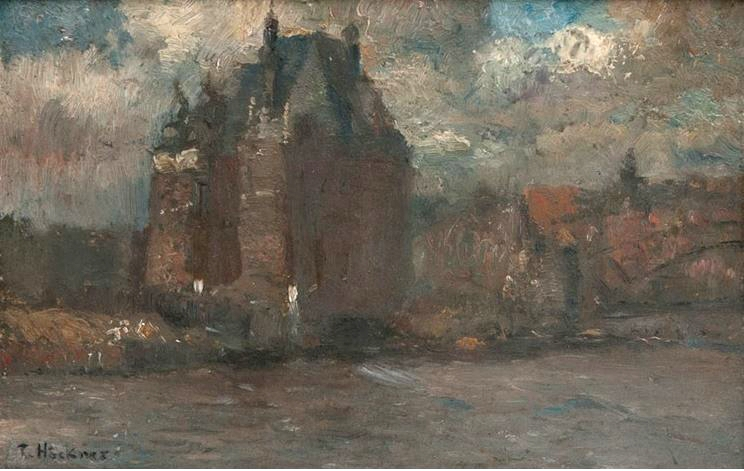
The Port of Hamburg

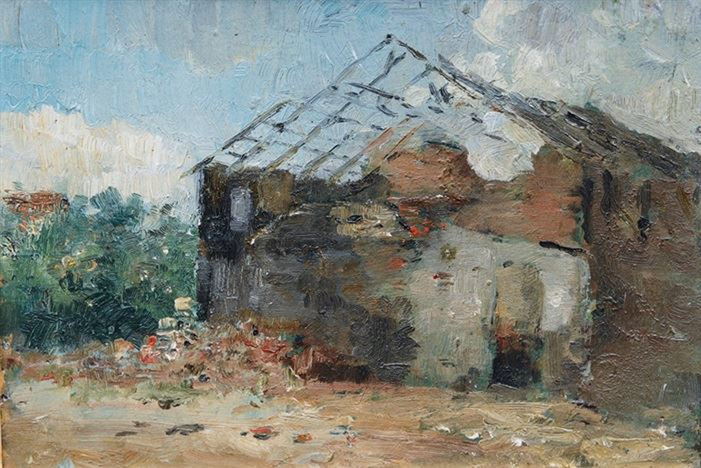
View of a Ruin
