= Alexander Olbricht =

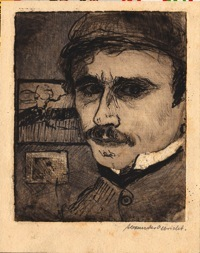
Self-portrait (date unknown)

Alexander Gustav Georg Olbricht (6 June 1876, in Breslau – 11 November 1942, in Weimar) was a German artist. He created approximately 2,000 graphics, engravings, silhouettes and oil paintings.

== Biography ==
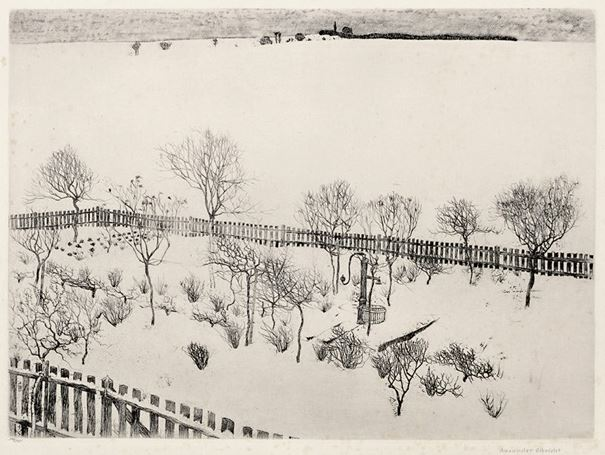
Garden in the Snow

His father, Gustav Olbricht (1851–1892) was a painter and art restorer at the Silesian Museum of Fine Arts. At the age of sixteen, he was employed by the firm of "P. Strunk", an art material supplier. After his father's death, he enrolled at the State Academy of Arts and Crafts, where he studied with the landscape painter, Carl Ernst Morgenstern.

In 1899, he transferred to the Grand-Ducal Saxon Art School, Weimar, and studied with Theodor Hagen. Five years later, he married Margarethe Thurow (1882–1972), from Mecklenburg, whom he had met at the school. After this, he gradually gave up oil painting in favor of graphics and printmaking.

In 1908, he produced his first large format etchings and, the following year, produced a series of twenty small format etchings depicting Weimar and its surroundings. He was drafted at the beginning of World War I but, due to his relatively frail condition, served only briefly as a batman to an officer in Weimar.

In 1921, he was named a professor at Bauhaus University. He served until 1935, when he was dismissed for political reasons, despite having become tenured. In 1936, the Nazi government dissolved and banned the Deutscher Künstlerbund, of which he had been a member for many years. Together, this resulted in a period of stagnation and depression. Nevertheless, in 1939, he was able to complete his last major cycle of etchings, "The First Snow".

He died of a stroke in 1942. Following the war, a street in Weimar was named after him, his studio was reconstructed at the Stadtmuseum Weimar and a plaque was placed on his home. The Duchess Anna Amalia Library acquired 88 books from his estate. Some of his works may be seen at the Museum of Modern Art in New York and the Los Angeles County Museum of Art.
