= Hermann Graf (artist) =

German painter

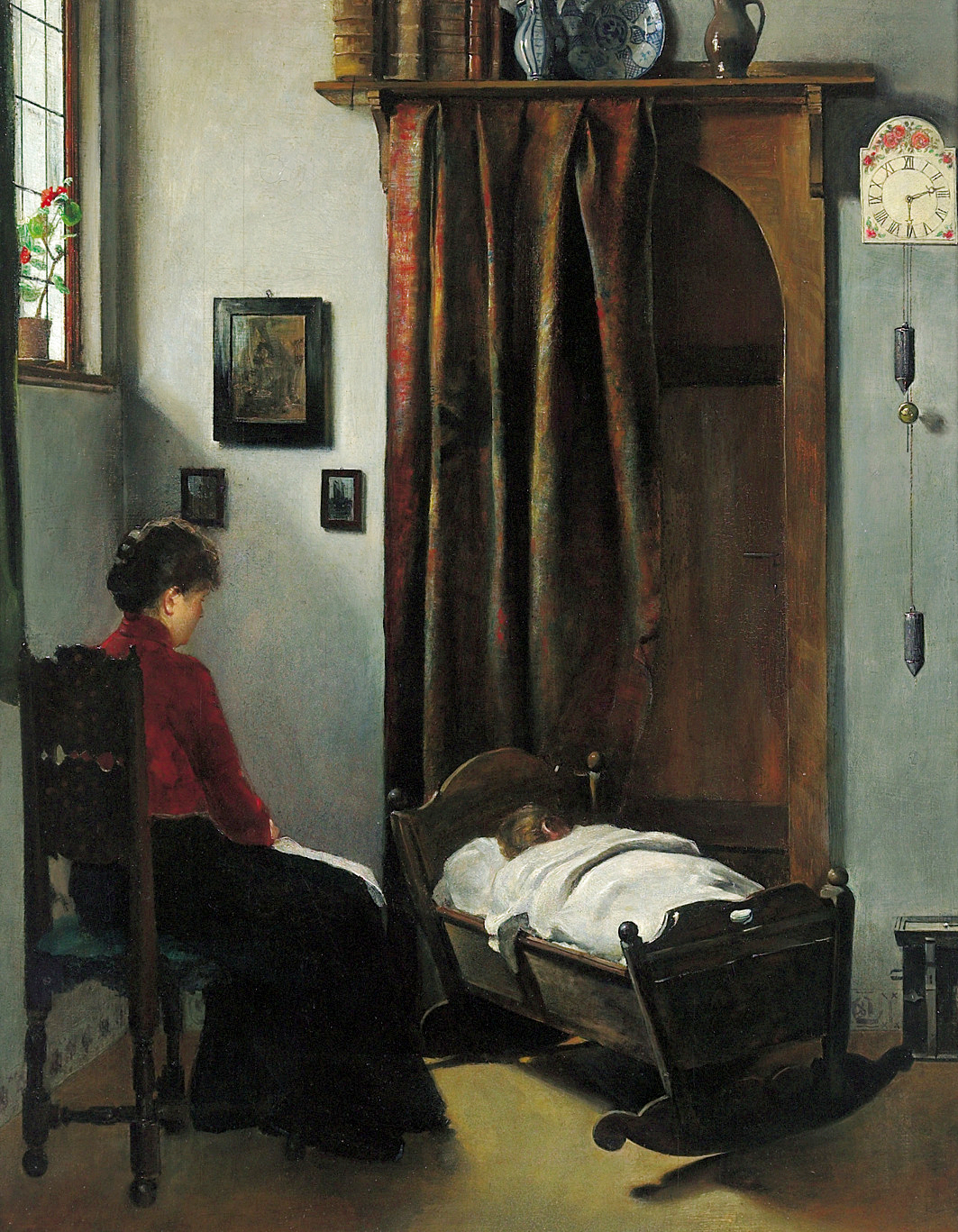
Hermann Graf, Well-guarded Sleep (private collection)

Herman Graf (1873 in Frankfurt – 1940) was a German painter known for his introspective interior scenes.

== Biography ==
Hermann Graf was a German realist painter about whose life unfortunately little is known. He was born in Frankfurt am Main in 1873, son of Franz Josef Graf, and died in Weimar in 1940. The latest work of his which can be positively dated appears to be 1908. He lived in Weimar, and received his early artistic formation there under Max Thedy (1858-1924). Later he studied at the Munich Academy under Karl von Marr (1858-1936) and Ludwig von Löfftz (1845-1910).

His style is one of quiet introspection and stillness, reminiscent of Vermeer in many ways. Like Vermeer, he was fascinated by the play of light on objects, and rooms illuminated by light from a single window. Graf specialized in interiors, often with a person engaged in a solitary task. He frequently included paintings in his compositions, as well as objects such as plates and vases for reflections or glints of light. He also did seascapes.

After 1904 he exhibited regularly and was a member of the Munich artist cooperative. His works are in German and Hungarian museums.

== Museum and gallery holdings ==
- Berlin (Akademie der Künste): Still-life
- Budapest: Bedroom in the Biedermeier Style
- Budapest (Andrasy Gal.): Schiller's House
- Weimar: Near the Lamp
- Frankfurt am Main, Städelsches Kunstinstitut und Städtische Galerie, Der rote Tisch

== Works ==
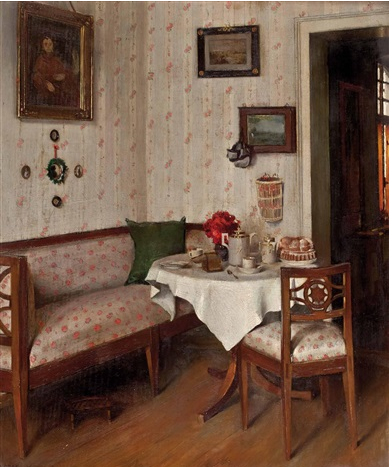
Room Decorated in Biedermeier Style

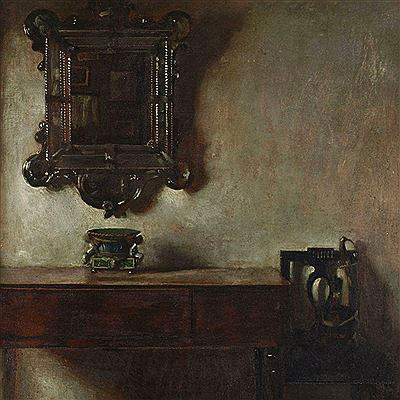
Quiet Interior with Table and Mirror

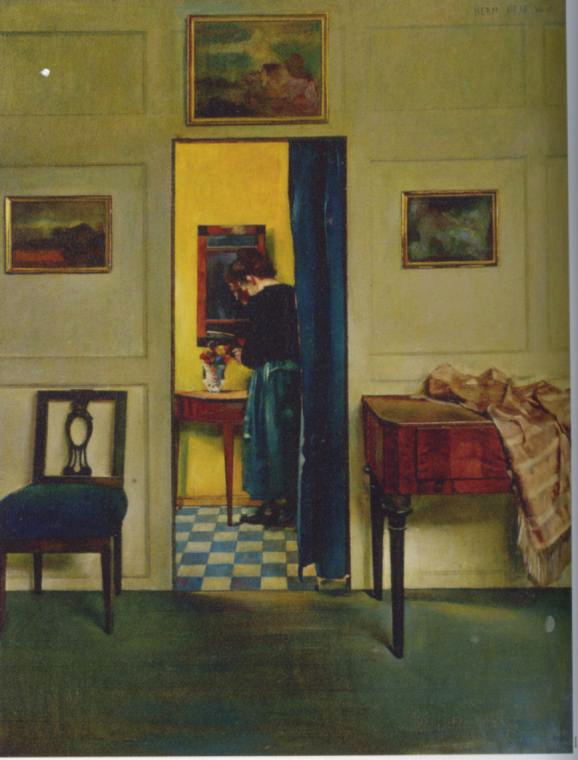
Woman Arranging Flowers

== Additional Sources ==
- H. Weizsacker and A. Dessoff, Kunst und Kunstler in Frankfurt am Main im 19. Jahrhundert, Vol. II (1909)
- S. Raetzer in Westermanns Monatshefte, Vol. 127, I (1919), 251-61
