= Karl Buchholz =

German landscape painter

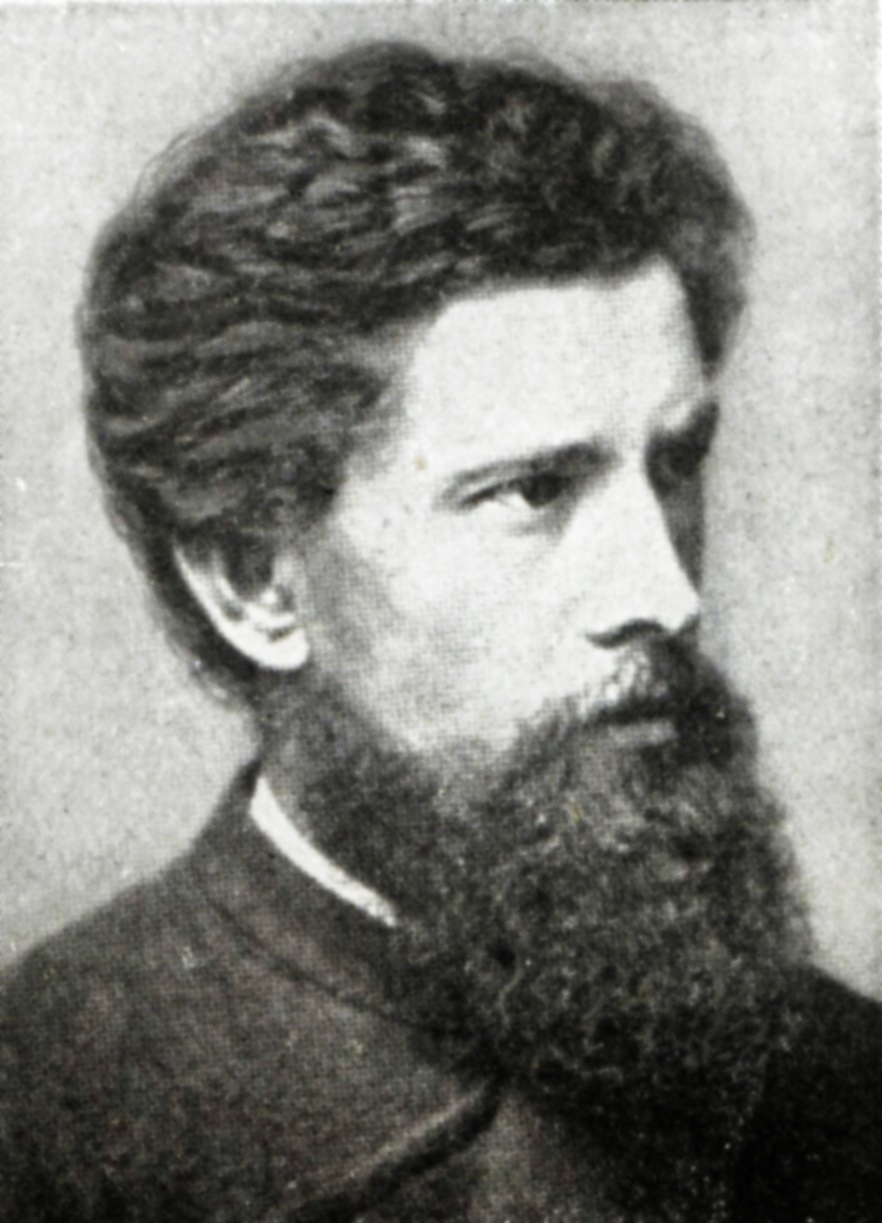
Karl Buchholz; from Velhagen & Klasings Monatshefte

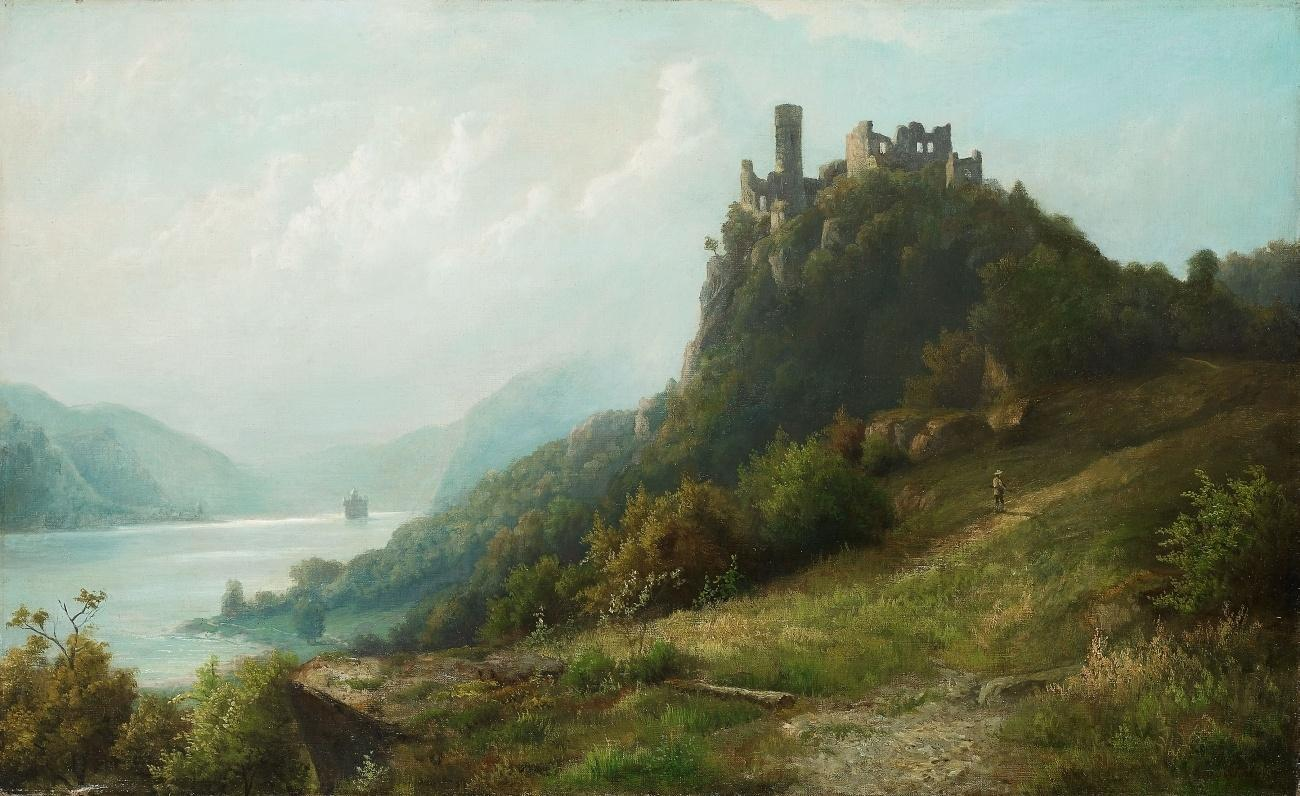
The Schönburg at Oberwesel and Pfalzgrafenstein Castle, Kaub

Karl Buchholz (23 February 1849 – 29 May 1889) was a German landscape painter who worked in oils and watercolors. He also produced drawings and etchings. His output was rather small and his works are widely scattered.

== Life and work ==
He was born in Schloßvippach. In 1867, he became a student at the Grand-Ducal Saxon Art School, Weimar. His primary instructor there was the landscape painter, Max Schmidt. From 1871, he was a Master Student of Professor Theodor Hagen at the Kunstakademie Düsseldorf. His instruction included the practice of painting en plein air, based on the teachings of the Barbizon School.

He set up his own studio immediately after completing his studies. He preferred simple pictures, with barren areas or trivial items occupying the center of the canvas. Great attention was given to lighting effects for the appropriate time of day. Most of his works were painted in the area immediately around Weimar, although he also worked in the Harz Mountains and Thuringia. Lovis Corinth was especially attracted to his work and called him a genius.

He committed suicide at the age of forty, in Oberweimar.
