= Albert Brendel =

Albert Brendel may refer to:

- Albert Brendel (Wehrmacht officer) (1893–1943), Knight's Cross of the Iron Cross recipient
- Albert Heinrich Brendel (1827–1878), German painter
