= Johann Wilhelm Cordes =

German painter

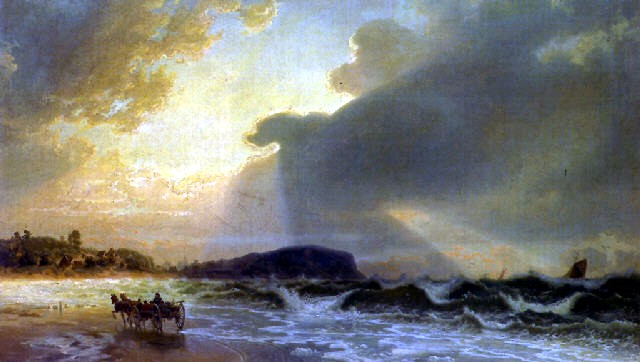
Beach on the Baltic Sea

Johann Wilhelm Cordes (14 March 1824 – 16 August 1869) was a German landscape painter.

== Biography ==
He was born in Lübeck. He came from a family of merchants and had his primary education at the Katharineum. Originally, he was apprenticed to a commercial firm, but soon developed an interest in becoming a painter. He enrolled at the Academy of Fine Arts, Prague then, in 1842, transferred to the Kunstakademie, where he studied with Carl Friedrich Lessing and Johann Wilhelm Schirmer. This was followed by private lessons in Frankfurt with Jakob Becker. In 1848, he was a volunteer in the army of Schleswig-Holstein and served in the First Schleswig War.

He specialized in realistic landscapes, painted while travelling. From 1851 to 1854, he made several trips to Scandinavia with Hans Fredrik Gude, a friend from Düsseldorf. He also created coastal scenes with staffage.

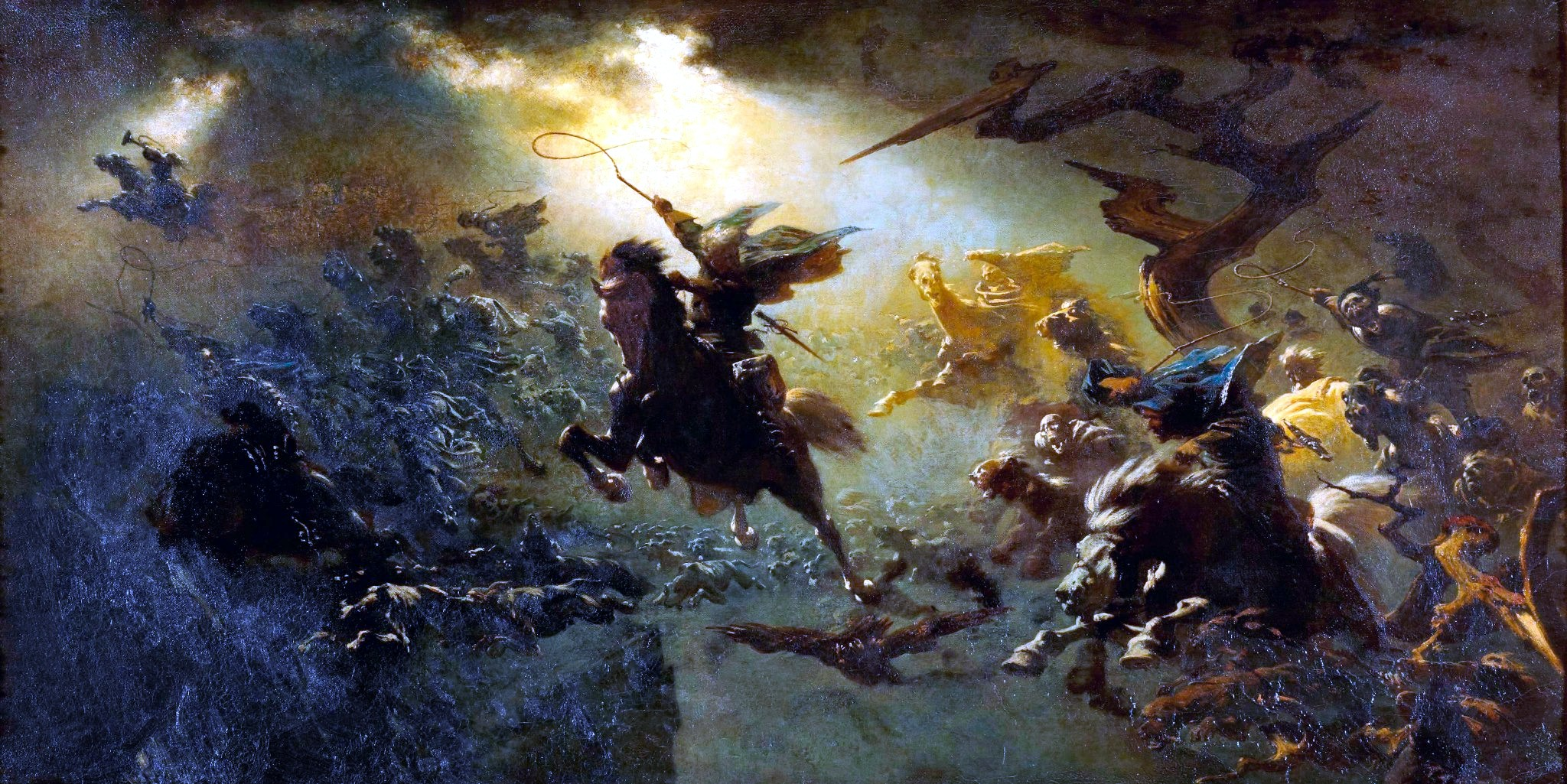
The Wild Hunt (unfinished)

In 1856, he returned to Lübeck and, three years later, at the request of Grand Duke Carl Alexander, moved to Weimar. This was his most productive period. He was appointed a professor at the Weimar Saxon Grand Ducal Art School and, in 1862, was awarded the Order of the White Falcon.

In 1866, during the Austro-Prussian War, he took part in some military maneuvers and returned ill. He sought recovery at the spa in Travemünde, but died in 1869 at a friend's home in Lübeck. He never married and had no children, so his estate passed to his brother, Emil, who donated the remaining paintings to the Behnhaus museum.
