= Hans Olde =

German painter

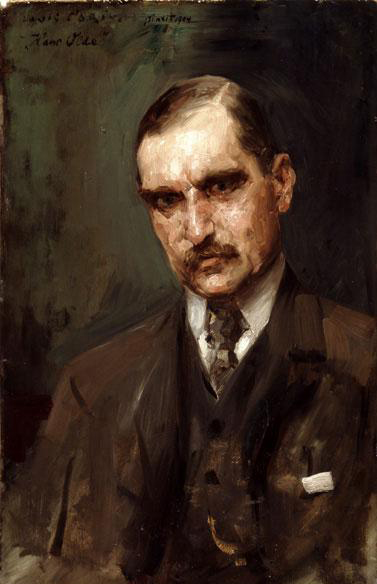
Hans Olde. Portrait by Lovis Corinth (1904)

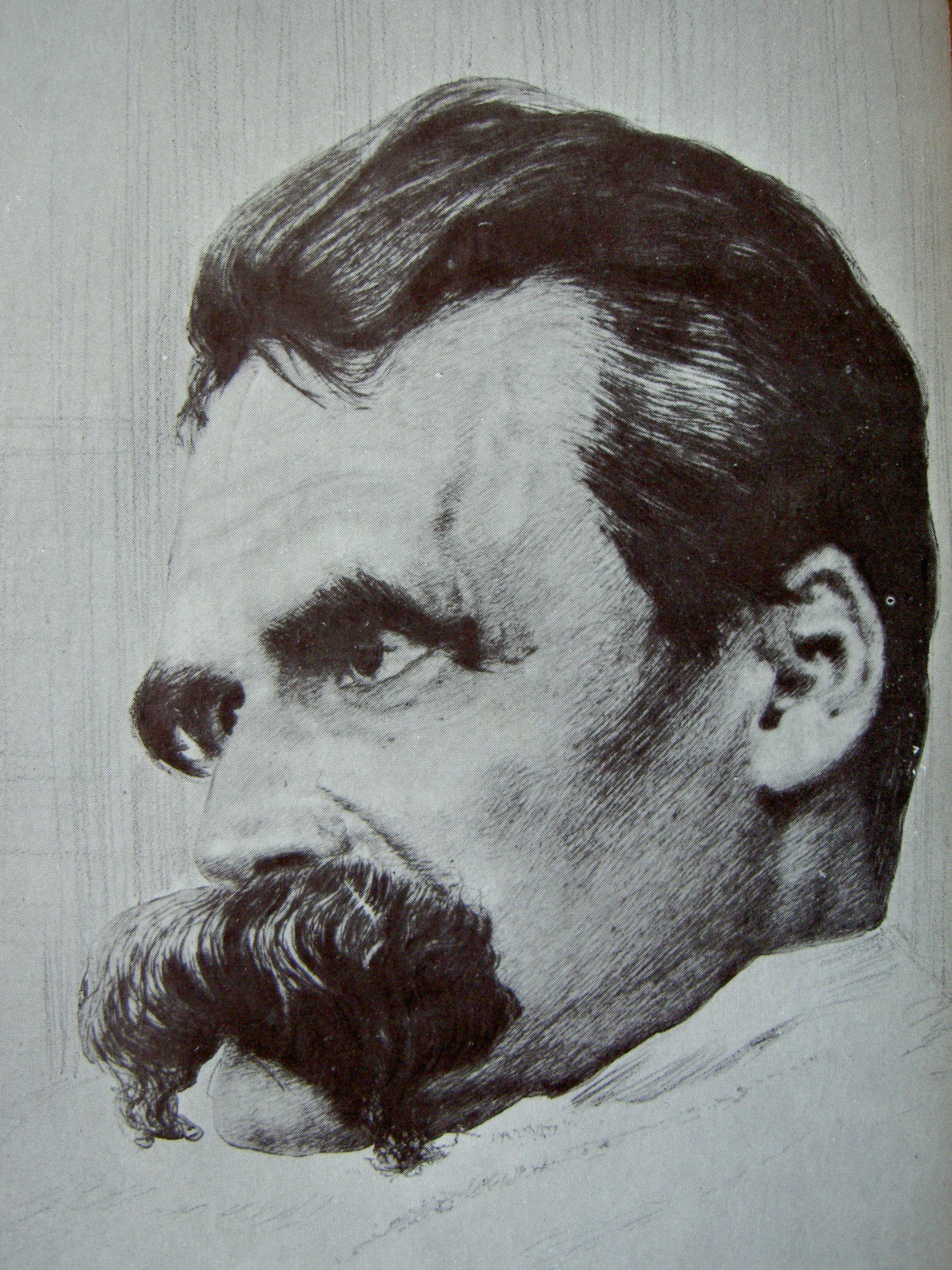
Drawing of Nietzsche, from the magazine Pan (1899/1900 edition)

Johannes Wilhelm (Hans) Olde (27 April 1855, Süderau – 25 October 1917, Kassel) was a German painter and art school administrator.

== Life ==
He originally planned to follow family tradition and become a farmer but, over his father's strong objections, went to study with Ludwig von Löfftz at the Academy of Fine Arts Munich in 1879. He and his friend, the sculptor Adolf Brütt, moved to Italy in 1883. Three years later, however, he decided to attend the Académie Julian in Paris, where he exhibited at the Salon and discovered impressionism. Upon his return to Germany, he was one of the founders of the Munich Secession and, in 1894, helped to create the Schleswig-Holstein Art Appreciation Society. He travelled widely over the next few years and this is considered to be his most creative period. In 1898, he also participated in the founding of the Berlin Secession. Friedrich Nietzsche is one of his most famous portrait subjects.

In 1902, when Olde became director of the Weimar Saxon-Grand Ducal Art School, he began working on plans to create a university and instituted many reforms, including the admission of women. When Brütt became director of the Weimar Sculpture School in 1905, the schools were joined as the "Grand Ducal Saxon College of Fine Arts", which would later be joined with the Grand Ducal Saxon School of Arts and Crafts to become the "Staatlisches Bauhaus" (today's Bauhaus University).

During this time, Olde, Brütt and Henry van de Velde acted as advisors for Grand Duke Wilhelm Ernst's renovation of Weimar's city center. Olde became the director of the Royal Academy of Art in Kassel in 1911 and began the process of turning that school into a university as well. (Today, it is a division of the University of Kassel called the Kunsthochschule Kassel)

Three streets are named after him; in Kiel, Dänischenhagen (where he is buried) and Blankenfelde-Mahlow. His son, Hans Olde the Younger, was also a painter.
