= Paul Eduard Crodel =

German landscape painter

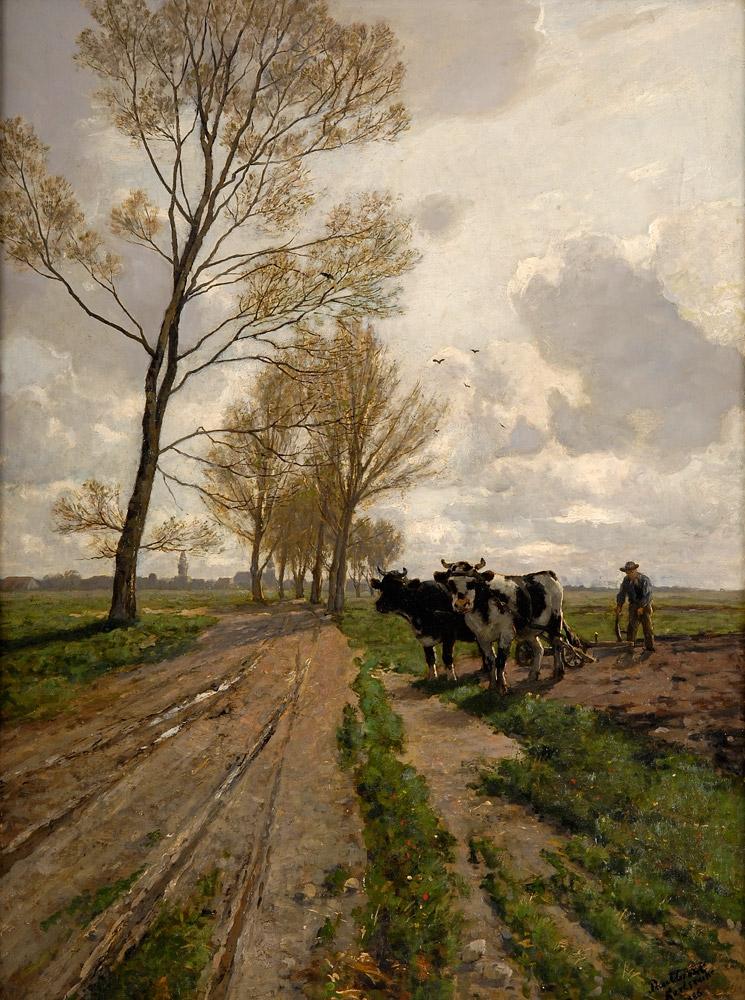
Spring Landscape with Ox-plow

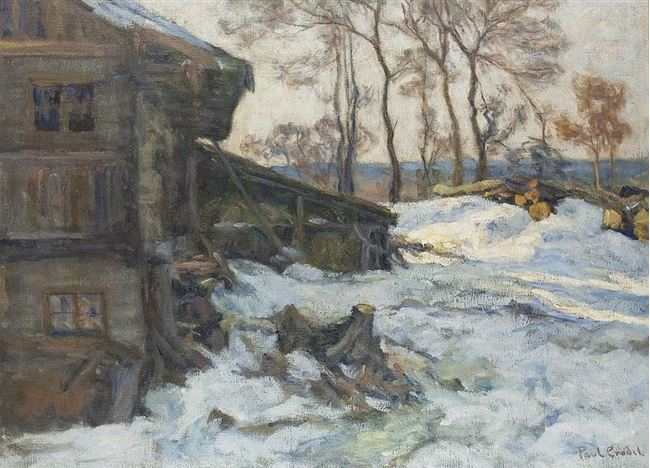
Winter Landscape Near Munich

Paul Eduard Crodel (7 September 1862 – 28 July 1928) was a German landscape painter and a co-founder of the Munich Secession. He was sometimes known as "Schnee-und-Regen-Crodel" (Snow-and-Rain Crodel).

== Biography ==
Born in Cottbus, he came from a family of artists, dating back to the late 15th century. From 1882 to 1885, he studied at the Grand-Ducal Saxon Art School, Weimar, with Woldemar Friedrich and Theodor Hagen. Then, he spent three years at the Academy of Fine Arts, Karlsruhe, in the studio of Hermann Baisch. Upon completing his studies, he moved to Munich and held several showings at the Glaspalast. In 1892, he was involved in establishing the Munich Secession.

He observed the practice of painting en plein aire and became involved in the private academy, in the suburbs north of Munich, that was operated by Bernhard Buttersack. His fellow students there included Christian Landenberger, Otto Ubbelohde and Wilhelm Ludwig Lehmann. Later, possibly at the suggestion of Lehmann, who was Swiss, he explored the Alps in the vicinity of Isny and spent the winter of 1907–08 in Switzerland.

In 1909, he was called to serve on the commission of the Venice Biennale. He exhibited there that same year and again in 1910. He was on the jury of the Munich Secession in 1911 and was also a member of the Deutscher Künstlerbund; dating from their first joint exhibition with the Secession in 1904.

He died of a stroke, at the age of sixty-six, near Dietramszell and was interred at the Alter Zwölf-Apostel-Kirchhof in Berlin with other members of his family.

His daughter, Erna Dinklage, also became a painter under his tutelage, and he promoted the career of his nephew, Charles Crodel.
