= Ferdinand Schauss =

German painter

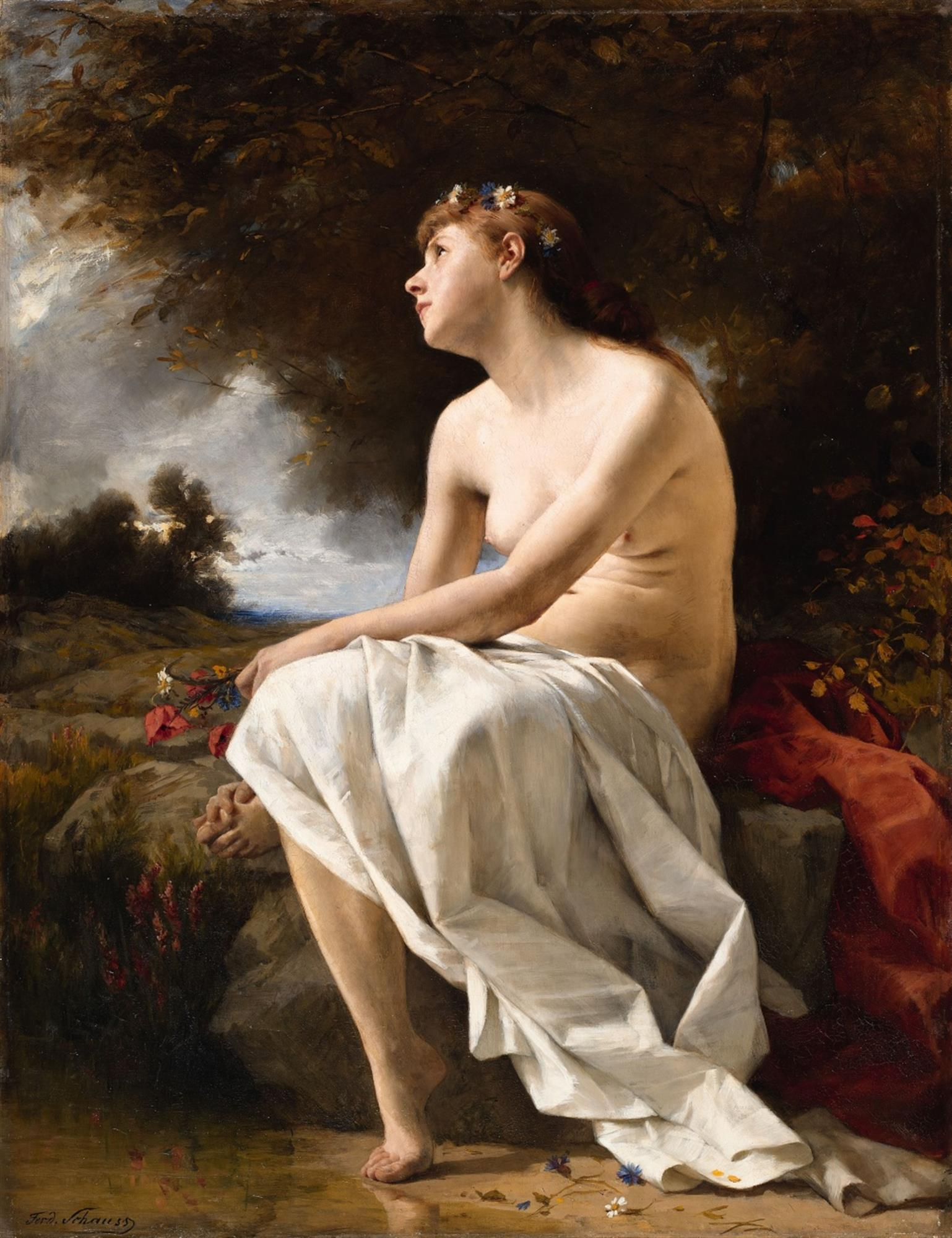
Elegie

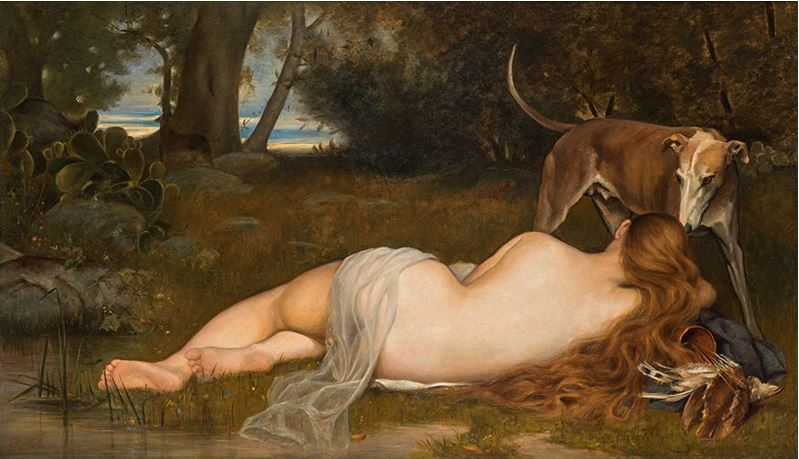
A Resting Nymph

Ferdinand Schauss, or Schauß (27 October 1832 – 20 October 1916) was a German painter who specialized in portraits, genre scenes and mythological characters.

== Biography ==
Schauss was the son of a Berlin merchant. He attended the Friedrichswerdersches Gymnasium, a prestigious school established by Frederick William, Elector of Brandenburg. Later, he studied art with Carl Steffeck at the Prussian Academy of Arts. From 1856, he continued his studies with Léon Cogniet in Paris at the École des Beaux Arts.

He travelled widely, making study trips to England, Holland, Belgium, Italy and Spain, copying portraits made by the Old Masters. In 1873 he was named a Professor at the Grand-Ducal Saxon Art School, Weimar. He held this position until 1876, then returned to Berlin.

He was a regular participant in the exhibitions at the Art Academy, the Große Berliner Kunstausstellung, the Glaspalast (Munich) and at the Vienna Jahresausstellungen. Among his best known portrait sitters were Désirée Artôt and Franz Liszt.

He died, just before his 84th birthday, in Berlin.
