= Grand-Ducal Saxon Art School, Weimar =

Former art school in Weimar, Germany

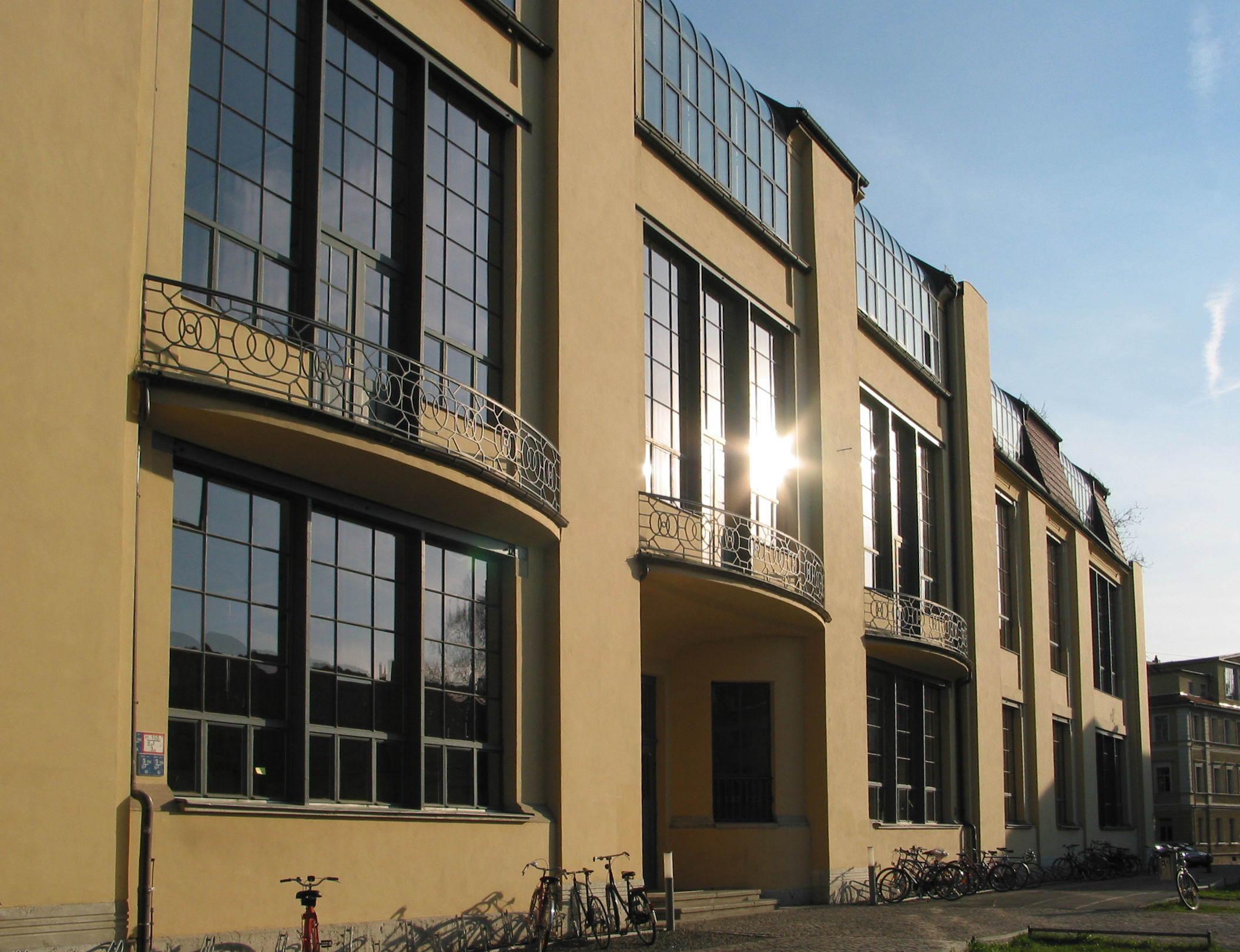
The Art School Building, now the main building of the Bauhaus-University Weimar.

The Grand-Ducal Saxon Art School, Weimar (German: Großherzoglich-Sächsische Kunstschule Weimar) was founded on 1 October 1860, in Weimar, Germany, by a decree of Charles Alexander, Grand Duke of Saxe-Weimar-Eisenach. It existed until 1910, when it merged with several other art schools to become the Großherzoglich Sächsische Hochschule für Bildende Kunst ("Grand-Ducal Saxon School for Fine Arts"). It should not be confused with the Weimar Princely Free Drawing School, which existed from 1776 to 1930 and, after 1860, served as a preparatory school.

== History ==
From 1870 to 1900, the students and teachers of the school turned away from the academic tradition of idealized compositions. Inspired by the Barbizon School, they went directly to nature for their inspiration, in genre as well as landscape painting. This approach set the school apart and attracted attention throughout Europe.

=== Grand-Ducal Saxon School for Fine Arts, Weimar ===
In 1910, William Ernest, Grand Duke of Saxe-Weimar-Eisenach, in cooperation with Hans Olde (Director of the Art School), Adolf Brütt (Director of the Sculpture School) and Henry van de Velde (Director of the School of Arts & Crafts), joined the three schools to create the Großherzoglich Sächsische Hochschule für Bildende Kunst ("Grand-Ducal Saxon School for Fine Arts"), headed by Fritz Mackensen.

=== Building ===
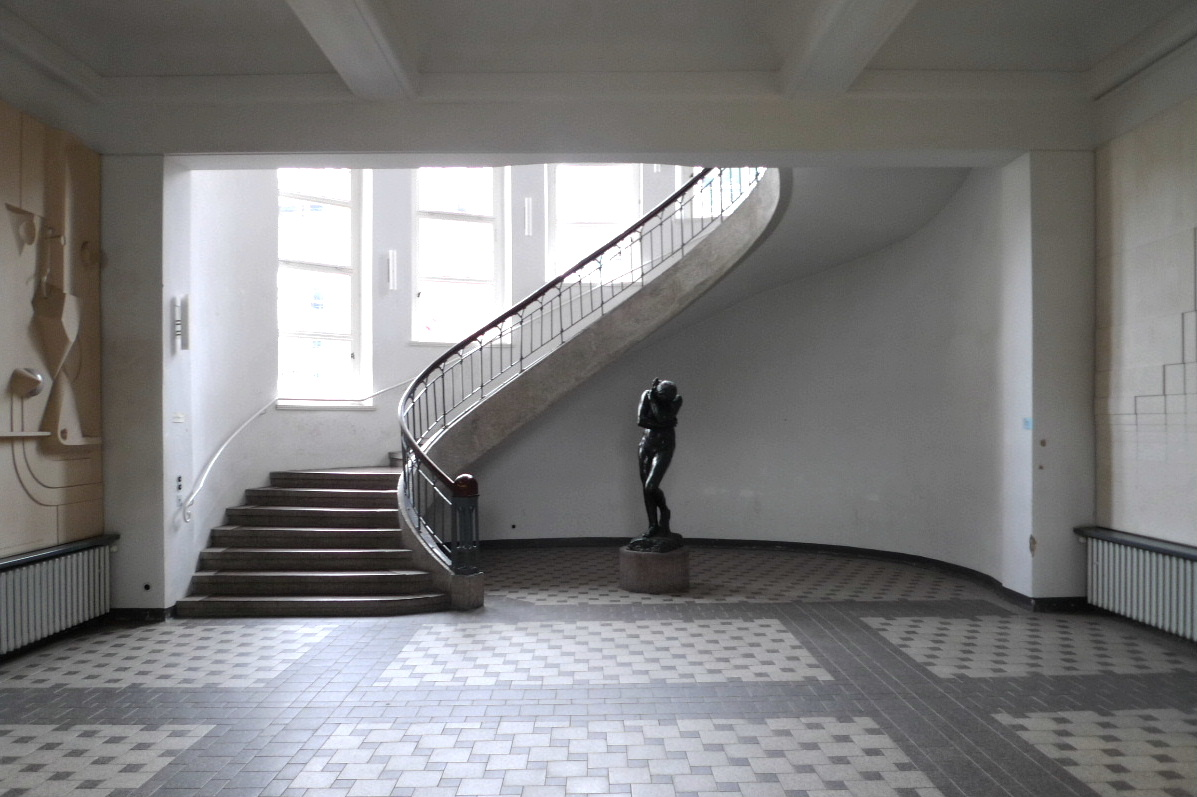
Foyer, with Rodin's "Eve".

The Art Nouveau art school building, designed by Henry van de Velde, was built between 1904 and 1911. Of particular note in the building's interior are the Oberlichtsaal (skylight hall), the elliptical staircase and the statue of Eve by Auguste Rodin. From 1919 to 1925 this building, and the neighbouring former Grand-Ducal Saxon School of Arts and Crafts building (built 1905–1906), also designed by van de Velde, were used by the Bauhaus art school, which was founded by Walter Gropius.

In 1996 both van de Velde buildings on the site, which are now used by the Bauhaus University Weimar, were included as part of the Bauhaus and its Sites in Weimar, Dessau and Bernau World Heritage site.

== Associated people ==
=== Directors and lecturers ===
By date of appointment.

Name	Life	Class	Teacher (dates)	Director (dates)	Pupils	Notes
Stanislaus von Kalckreuth	1820–1894			1860–1876		
Alexander Michelis	1823–1888		1863–1868			
Arnold Böcklin	1827–1901		1860–1862			
Arthur von Ramberg	1819–1875		1860–1866			
Carl Hummel	1821-1907	Landscape painting	1860-?			
Franz von Lenbach	1836–1904		1860-?			
Johann Wilhelm Cordes	1824–1869		1860–1869			
Reinhold Begas	1831–1911		1861-(1863?)			
Ferdinand Pauwels	1830–1904	History painting	1862–1872			
Bernhard Plockhorst	1825–1907	History and portrait painting, Drawing	1866–1869			
Paul Thumann	1834–1908	Genre painting	1866-?			A former pupil of F. Pauwels
Max Schmidt	1818–1901		1868–1872			
Charles Verlat	1824–1890	Animal painting	1869-?			
Karl Gussow	1843–1907		1870			
Theodor Hagen	1841–1919	Landscape painting	1871	1877–1881		Also taught from 1881
Albert Baur	1835–1906		1872-(1876?)			
Ferdinand Schauss	1832–1916	Portrait and genre painting	1873–1876			
Franz Gustav Arndt	1842-1905	Landscape painting	1876-?			Former pupil, ab 1879 Secretary of the School of Arts
Willem Linnig the Younger	1842-1890	Genre and history painting	1876-?			Former pupil
Alexander Struys	1852-1941	History painting	1878-1882			
Albert Heinrich Brendel	1827–1895	Animal painting	?	1882–1885		
Max Thedy	1858–1924		1883			
Leopold von Kalckreuth	1855–1928		1885–1890			Former pupil, son of Stanislaus Kalckreuth
Edgar Meyer	1853-1925		1886-?			
Hans Olde	1855–1917			1902?-?		Established the Kunstschule as a Hochschule
Ludwig von Hofmann	1861–1945		1903–1907			Founder of the Neues Weimar movement
Gari Melchers	1860–1932		1909–1914			American (German father)
Albin Egger-Lienz	1868–1926		1912–1913			
Theodor Schindler	1870–1950		1913–1914			
Walther Klemm	1883–1957	Graphics	1913–?			

=== Alumni ===
- Carl Arp
- Hans Arp
- Paul Baum
- Max Beckmann
- Ella Bergmann-Michel,
- Ferdinand Brütt
- Karl Buchholz
- Julius Victor Carstens
- Paul Eduard Crodel
- Hans Delbrück
- Mathilde Freiin von Freytag-Loringhoven
- Ludwig von Gleichen-Rußwurm
- Karl Gussow
- August Haake
- Wilhelm Hasemann
- Rudolf Höckner
- Otto Illies
- Leopold Graf von Kalckreuth
- Otto von Kameke
- Max Liebermann
- Carl Malchin
- Carlo Mense
- Alexander Olbricht
- Otto Piltz
- Leon Pohle
- Harriet von Rathlef-Keilmann
- Adolf Rettelbusch
- Carl Rodeck
- Christian Rohlfs
- Hans Starcke
- Irma Stern
- Paul Thumann
- Minna Beckmann-Tube
- Eduard Weichberger
- Adolf Ziegler

== Bibliography ==
- Walther Scheidig: Die Weimarer Malerschule. Seemann, Leipzig 1991, ISBN 3-363-00538-5.
- Hendrik Ziegler: Die Kunst der Weimarer Malerschule. Von der Pleinairmalerei zum Impressionismus. Böhlau, Köln, Weimar, Wien 2001, ISBN 3-412-15400-8.
- Gerda Wendemann et al.: Hinaus in die Natur: Barbizon, die Weimarer Malerschule und der Aufbruch zum Impressionismus. Christoph Kerber Verlag, Bielefeld 2010, ISBN 978-3-8667-8381-2.
- Jutta Hülsewig-Johnen, Thomas Kellein: Der Deutsche Impressionismus. DuMont-Buchverlag, Köln 2009, ISBN 978-3-8321-9274-7.
- Renate Müller-Krumbach, Karl Schawelka, Norbert Korrek, Gerwin Zohlen: Die Belebung des Stoffes durch die Form. Van de Veldes Hochschulbau in Weimar. Verlag der Bauhaus-Universität Weimar, Weimar 2002, ISBN 978-3-86068-166-4.
- Silke Opitz (Hrsg.): Van de Veldes Kunstschulbauten in Weimar. Architektur und Ausstattung. Verlag der Bauhaus-Universität Weimar, Weimar 2004, ISBN 3-86068-201-6.
- Michael Eckhardt (Hrsg.): Bauhaus-Spaziergang. In Weimar unterwegs auf den Spuren des frühen Bauhauses. Verlag der Bauhaus-Universität Weimar, Weimar 2009, ISBN 978-3-86068-378-1.
- Frank Simon-Ritz, Klaus-Jürgen Winkler, Gerd Zimmermann (Hrsg.): Aber wir sind! Wir wollen! Und wir schaffen! Von der Großherzoglichen Kunstschule zur Bauhaus-Universität. Verlag der Bauhaus-Universität Weimar, Weimar 2010, ISBN 978-3-86068-419-1.
- Schlenker, Sabine (2007): Mit dem Talent der Augen. Der Kunstkritiker Emil Heilbut (1861-1921) Ein Streiter für die moderne Kunst im Deutschen Kaiserreich, VDG-Verlag Weimar, ISBN 978-3-89739-563-3.
- Müllerschön, Bernd und Maier, Thomas (2002): Die Maler der Schule von Barbizon – Wegbereiter des Impressionismus, Ed. Thombe, ISBN 978-3-93525201-0.
- Stapf, Peter (2014): Der Maler Max Thedy 1858–1924, Böhlau Verlag Köln∙Weimar∙Wien, ISBN 978-3-412-22264-2.
- Fuß, Rowena (2013): Christian Rohlfs in Weimar: Das Frühwerk: 1870-1901 (Vorreiter ohne Vorbild), VDG-Verlag Weimar, ISBN 978-3-8973-9791-0.
- Plaul, Jens M. (2009): Max Oehler: Auf den Spuren eines Landschaftsmalers in Nachfolge der Weimarer Malerschule, 2. Auflage, Arbeitskreis Stadtgeschichte Blankenhain, ISBN 978-3-0000-4335-2
- Merseburger, Peter (2013): Mythos Weimar: Zwischen Geist und Macht, Pantheon Verlag München, ISBN 978-3-5705-5208-7.
- Häder, Ulf (1999): Der Jungbrunnen für die Malerei, Holland und die deutsche Kunst 1850–1900, page 168–171 and 286. Jena.
- Mai, Ekkehard (2010): Die Deutschen Kunstakademien im 19. Jahrhundert, Künstlerausbildung zwischen Tradition und Avantgarde, Böhlau Verlag Köln Weimar Wien, ISBN 978-3 412-20498-3.
- Whitford, Frank (1984): Bauhaus (World of Art), Thames and Hudson Ltd., London, ISBN 978-0-500-20193-0
- Seemann, E.A. (2000): Karl Buchholz, 1849-1889: Ein Künstler der Weimarer Malerschule, Seemann-Verlag, ISBN 978-3-363-00733-6.
- Dauer, Horst (1983): Die Weimarer Malerschule, Leipzig, Seemann-Verlag, ASIN B0026OK8UA.
- Deshmukh, Marion F. (2015): Max Liebermann Modern Art and Modern Germany, Ashgate Farnham, ISBN 978-1-4724-3415-9.
