= Paul Thumann =

German painter (1834–1908)

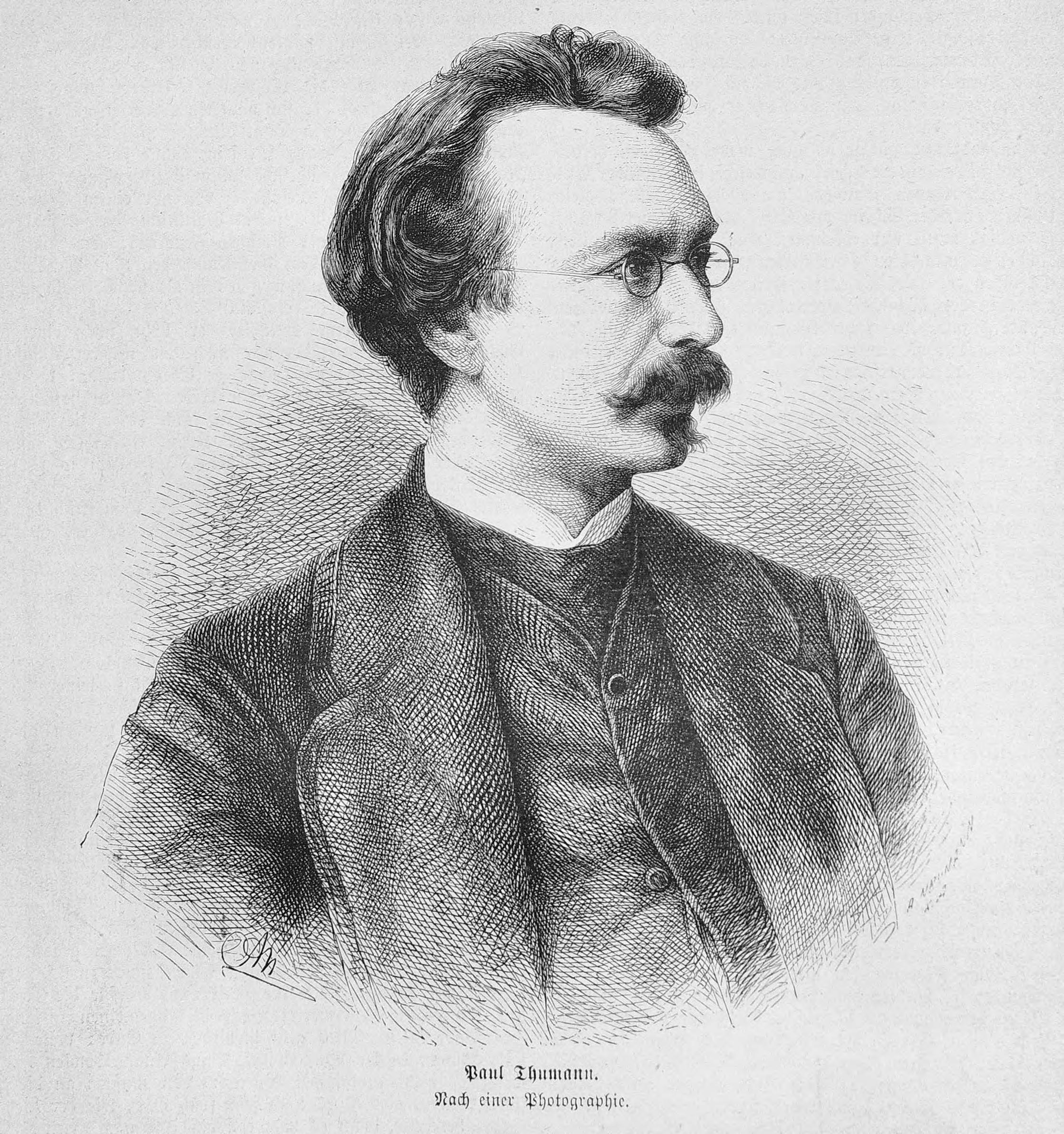
Paul Thumann, from Die Gartenlaube. (1875)

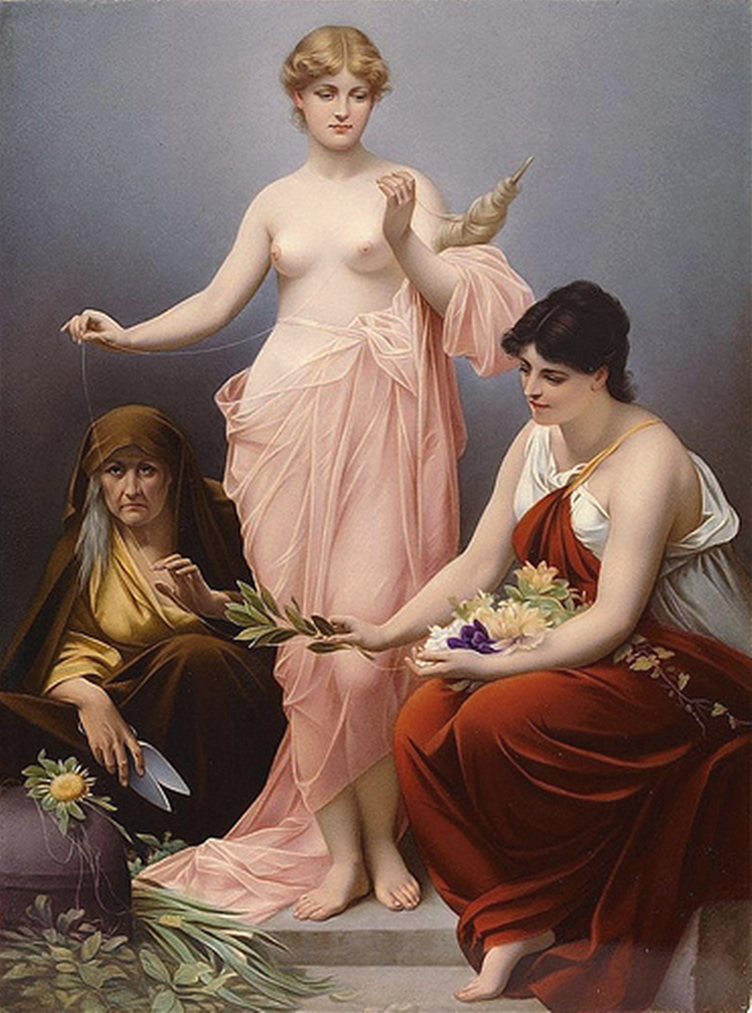
The Three Fates (date unknown)

Friedrich Paul Thumann (5 October 1834, Groß Schacksdorf-Simmersdorf – 19 February 1908, Berlin) was a German illustrator and painter.

== Life ==
He was the son of a teacher. Originally, he intended to take up a career in science and attended the engineering school in Glogau. His interests soon turned to art and, from 1854 to 1856, he attended the Prussian Academy of Arts in Berlin. Until 1860, he worked in the studios of Julius Hübner in Dresden. After two years in Leipzig, he entered the Weimar Saxon-Grand Ducal Art School, where he studied under Ferdinand Pauwels. He became a professor there in 1866.

During the Franco-Prussian War, he was a draftsman at the Prussian Third Army's headquarters. In 1875, he was appointed Professor at the Academy of Arts, Berlin and held that position until 1887. He travelled extensively throughout his life; visiting Hungary and Transylvania and spending some time studying in England, in addition to the usual art-related tours of Italy and France. From 1887 to 1891, he lived in Italy. He took over the Master Studio of Professor Julius Schrader in 1892. He primarily worked as an illustrator, producing plates for books by Goethe, Tennyson, Chamisso, Heine and many others. The elegance of his illustrations attracted many admirers but, as time went by, his work became increasingly facile.

He married a woman from the English nobility. One of his daughters married a brother of the poet Algernon Swinburne.

In 1893, Thumann exhibited his work Psyche at Nature's Mirror at the World's Columbian Exposition in Chicago where it got the interest of the management of the White Rock Mineral Water who then purchased the reproduction rights from Thumann to use the image as part of the logo for their mineral water.

== Illustrations (a selection) ==
- In: Album deutscher Kunst und Dichtung. Mit Holzschnitten nach Originalzeichnungen der Künstler, ausgeführt von R. Brend'amour. Friedrich Bodenstedt. - Berlin : Grote, 1867. Digitalized by the University and State Library Düsseldorf
- Adelbert von Chamisso, “Lebens-Lieder und Bilder”, with Illustrations by Paul Thumann
- Für Mutter und Kind. Alte Reime mit neuen Bildern von Paul Thumann (For Mother and Child. Old Rhymes with New Pictures by Paul Thumann)
