= August Haake =

German painter (1889–1915)

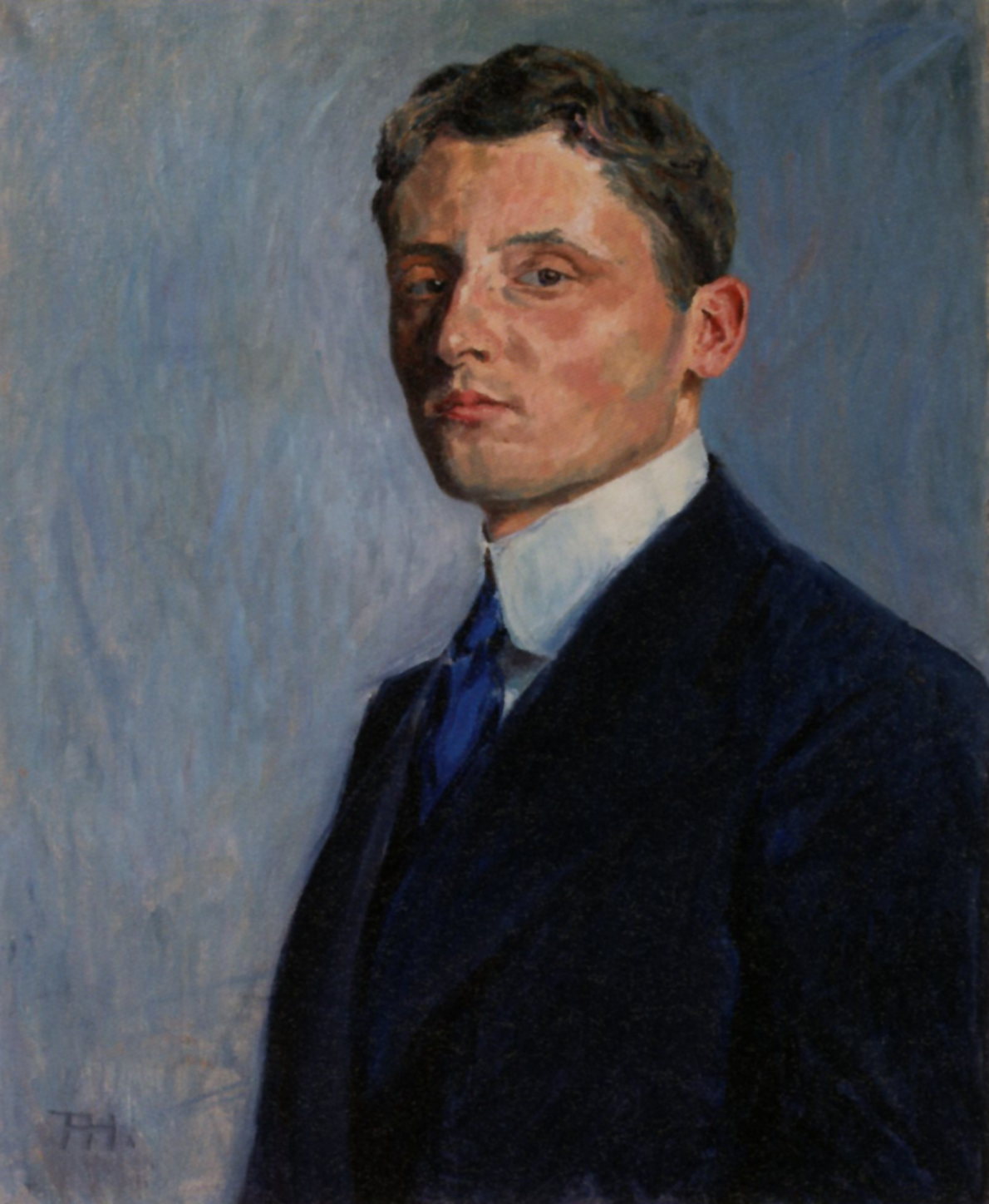
Self-portrait (c.1912)

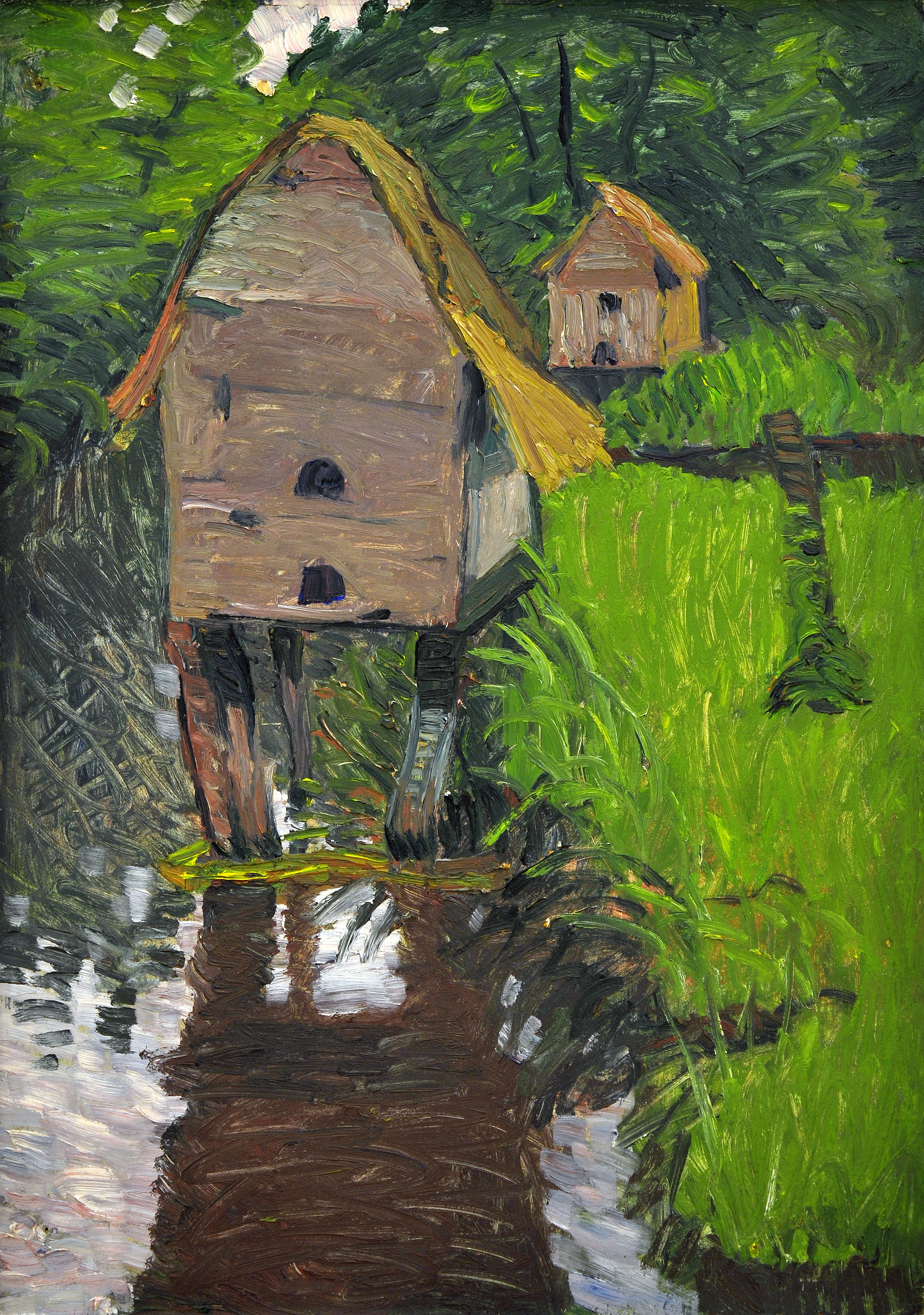
Duck Houses on the Wümme River (c.1912/13)

August Haake (7 December 1889 in Bremen – 2 January 1915 in Bremen) was a German landscape painter.

== Life and work ==
He was the only child of a wealthy businessman who dealt in furnishings and related items. As a child, he led a sheltered life due to a severe case of stuttering that would often leave him speechless. He was sent to a private preparatory school and later attended the Gymnasium but, because of his impediment, did poorly. In 1908, he decided not to continue his formal education, taking courses in stenography, typing and bookkeeping with the intention of following his father into business. He also underwent speech therapy, but to no avail. Finally, he and his father agreed that a business career was unsuitable and he began to pursue his interest in painting.

Walter Bertelsmann, a landscape painter and the son of one of his father's business acquaintances, gave him his first lessons, after which he attended the Bremen School of Applied Arts. Then, following Bertelsmann's recommendation, he went to the Weimar Saxon-Grand Ducal Art School where he became a Master Student of Fritz Mackensen. Every summer while he was a student (from 1910 to 1914), he would join Bertelsmann at the Fischerhude art colony in Worpswede, prolifically painting everything of interest in the local surroundings. It was there that he came under the influence of the Barbizon school and Van Gogh.

In 1914, he developed the symptoms of lead poisoning. Apparently, he had been in the habit of sharpening his brushes between his lips and absorbed lead from the white pigments. He died shortly after undergoing stomach surgery at St. Joseph's Hospital in Bremen. After his death, a young music student named Hipo Döhrman presented herself to his parents as his fiancée and was informally adopted into the family.

His paintings were kept by friends and family and were largely inaccessible to the public until 1967. Most are still in private ownership. As he usually didn't sign his paintings, attribution of his works is sometimes based solely on their original ownership or his habit of drilling two holes in his canvases, to dry them by hanging them on his back with a string while riding home on his motorcycle.
