= Albert Heinrich Brendel =

German painter

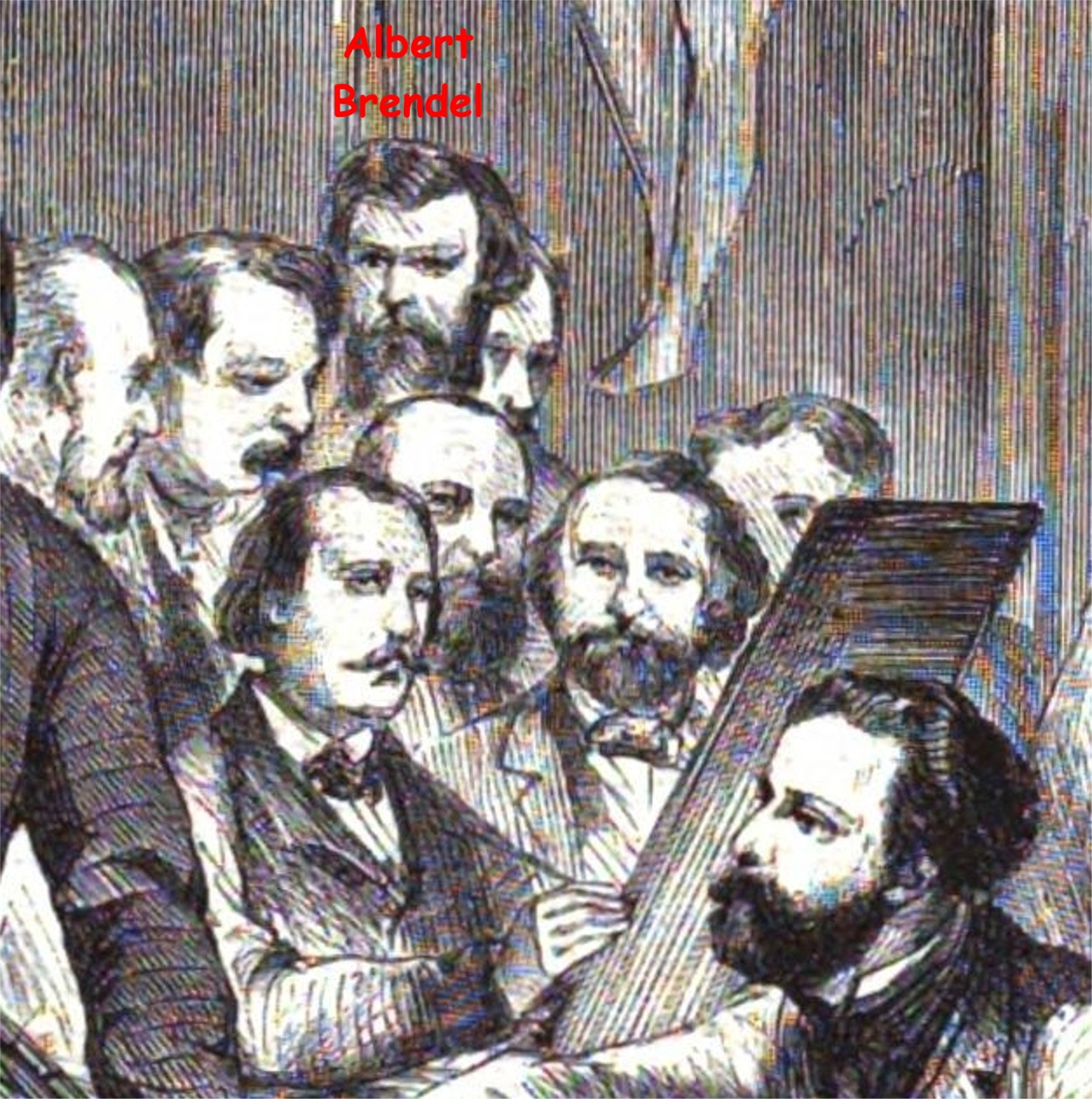
Albert Brendel in 1865, at a meeting with the Verein Berliner Künstler, by Ludwig Löffler.

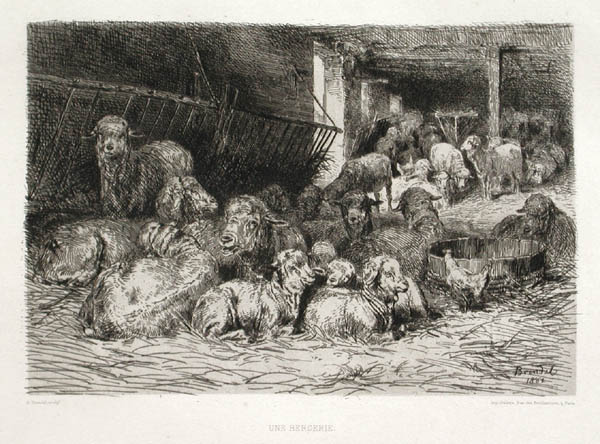
Sheepfold, 1862.

Albert Heinrich Brendel (1827–1895) was a German painter most famous for his depictions of animals in a rural setting. He was born in Berlin and studied in the Prussian Academy of Arts under Wilhelm Krause. In 1851 he went to Paris, and studied under Couture and Palizzi; thence to Italy, and home to Berlin in 1853, completing his studies under Carl Steffeck. For the next ten years he lived mainly in Paris, and worked in the summer months at Barbizon school, in the forest of Fontainebleau, which was also the scene of the labours of Jean-François Millet, Théodore Rousseau, Narcisse Virgilio Díaz, Constant Troyon, and other artists; and he continued, till 1869, to visit Barbison in the summer, after he moved in 1865 to Berlin for the winter. In 1868 he was made a member of the Berlin Academy, and in 1875 became professor at the Weimar Saxon-Grand Ducal Art School. His first works were sea-pieces, but afterwards he devoted himself to animal painting (more especially horses and sheep), in which he was very successful. He received medals at various exhibitions at Paris, Berlin, Munich, Vienna, and Nantes. He died in 1895.

Some paintings of his in public collections include:

- Berlin. Gallery. Return to the Village.
- Paris. Luxembourg. Sheepfold at Barbison (exhibited at the Salon in 1863).

== See also ==
- List of German painters
