= Alexander Michelis =

German landscape painter

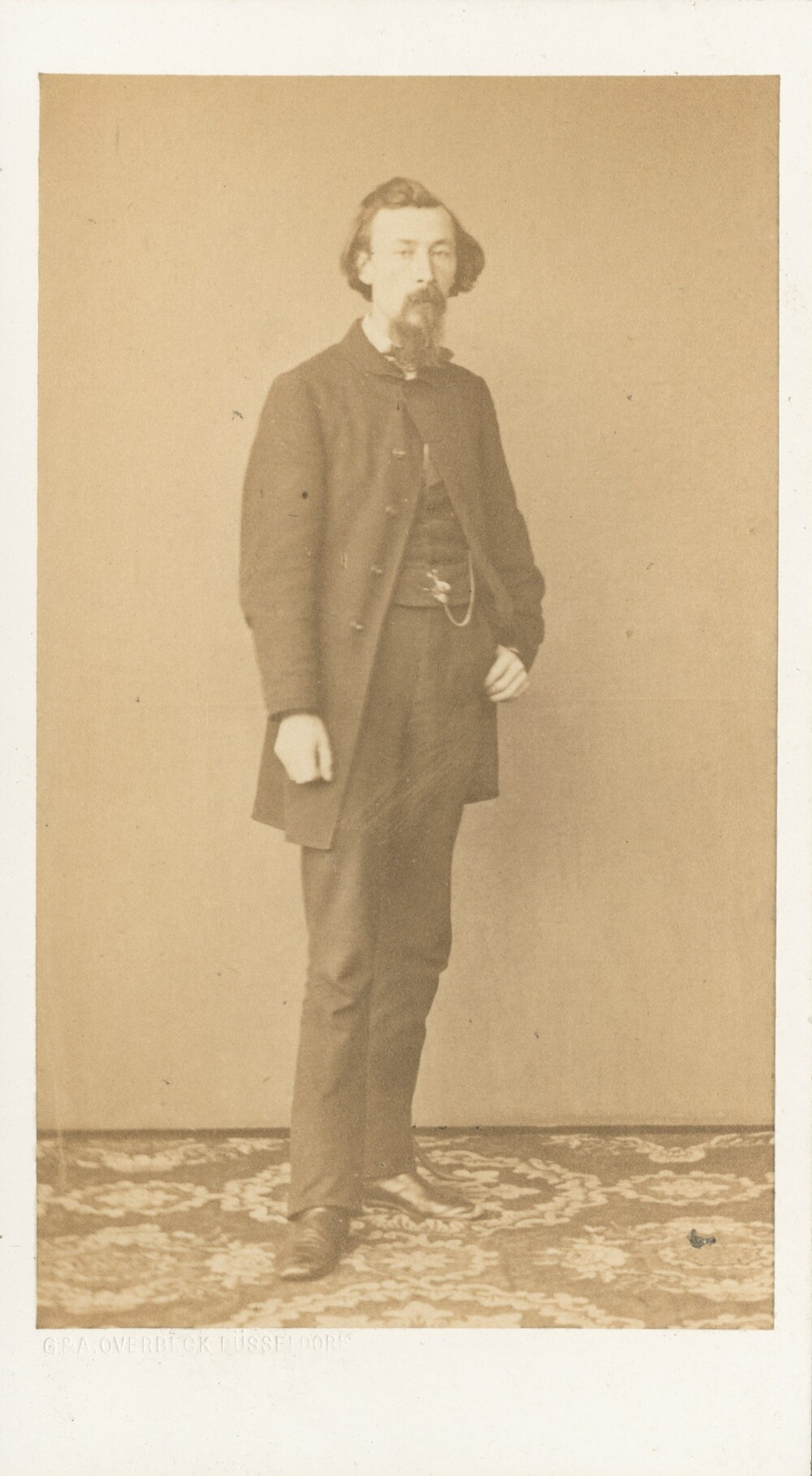
Alexander Michelis by G. & A. Overbeck (firm), c. 1868

Alexander Michelis (25 December 1823, in Münster – 23 January 1868, in Weimar) was a German landscape painter.

== Biography ==
His father, Franz Michelis (1762–1835), was a draftsman and engraver. From 1843 to 1851, he studied at the Kunstakademie Düsseldorf under the tutelage of Johann Wilhelm Schirmer. While there, he became a member of the Malkasten painters' association and succeeded Hermann Heinrich Becker as its Secretary

He spent ten years in Düsseldorf as a free-lance artist, but also gave private art lessons; notably to Princess Marie of Hohenzollern-Sigmaringen and Infanta Antónia of Portugal. In 1863, he was appointed a Professor at the Grand-Ducal Saxon Art School, Weimar, where he took the position originally held by Arnold Böcklin. He remained there until his death.

His older brother, Friedrich, was a well-known philosopher and theologian.
