= Max Thedy =

German painter, designer and engraver

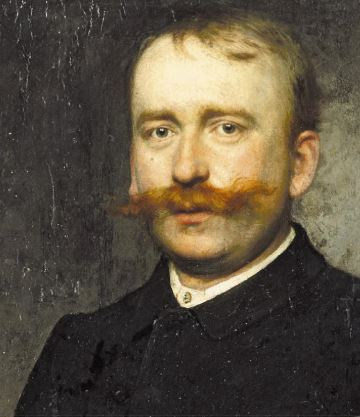
Max Thedy; portrait by Carl Frithjof Smith (1893, detail)

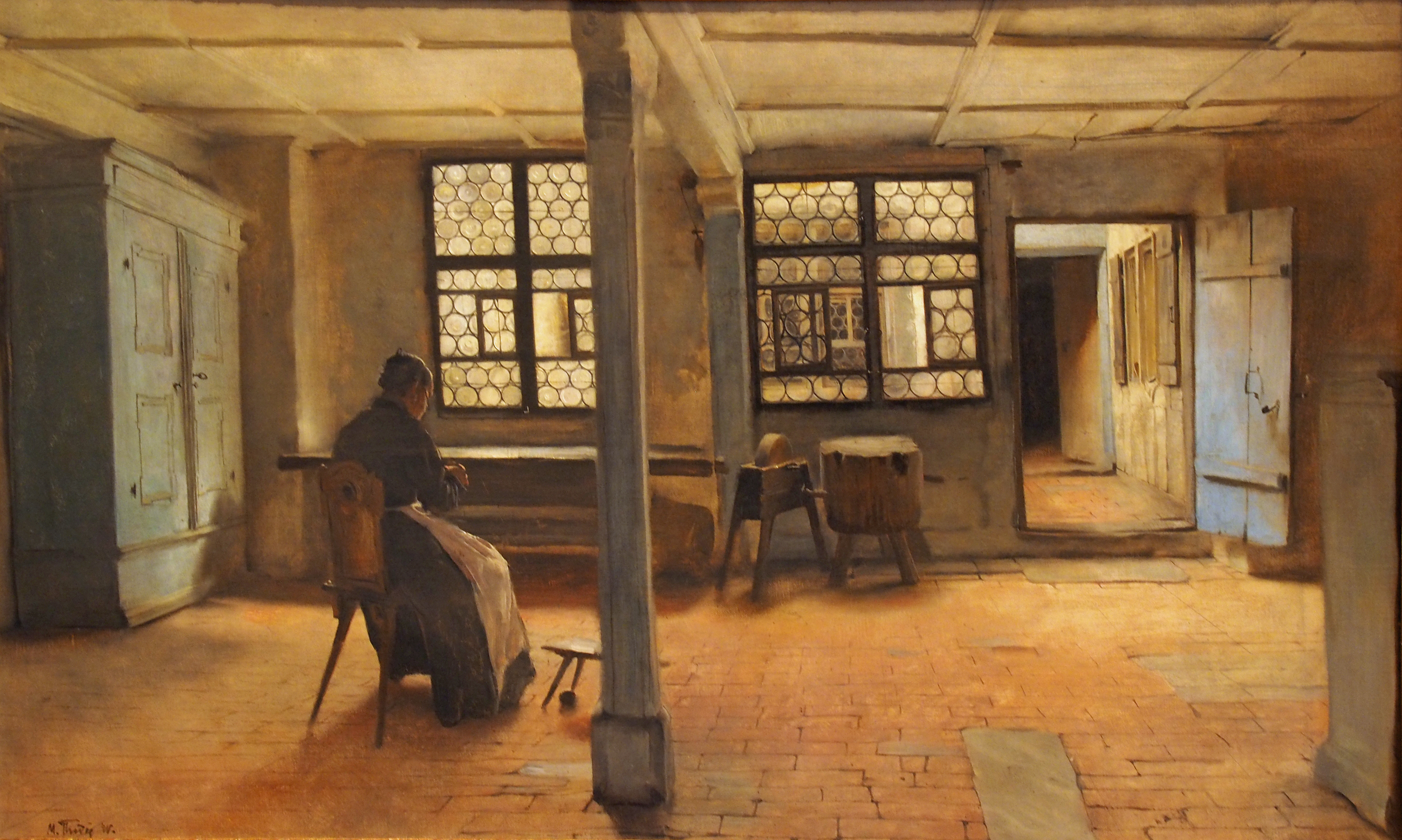
Parlor in Überlingen on Lake Constance

Max Thedy (16 October 1858 – 13 August 1924) was a German painter, designer and engraver. He is sometimes erroneously referred to as Marc Thedy.

== Biography ==
He was born in Munich. He was the youngest of twelve children born to Johann Valentin Thedy, a Verwaltungsaktuar (administrative assistant in the community government) and his wife, Theresia. After his parents' premature deaths, he was taken in by the family of the Hamburg painter, Georg Friedrich Louis Reinhardt (1819–1905) and encouraged to pursue a career in art.

After 1875, he was a student at the Academy of Fine Arts, Munich. In 1882, aged only twenty-four, he was called to be a professor at the Grand-Ducal Saxon Art School, Weimar. Among his best known students were Elisabeth Thiermann, Christian Rohlfs, Ernest Biedermann and Rudolf Schmidt-Dethloff. In 1919, he became an instructor at the Bauhaus and, in 1921, was named a Professor there. He died in 1924 in Polling.

His works have been shown throughout Europe and the United States; most recently at exhibitions in Weimar (2002), Überlingen and Frankfurt am Main (2005).
