= Max Schmidt =

German landscape painter

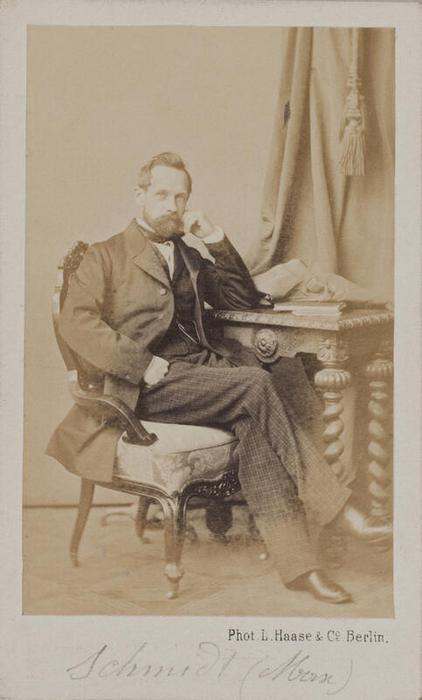
Max Schmidt (before 1880)

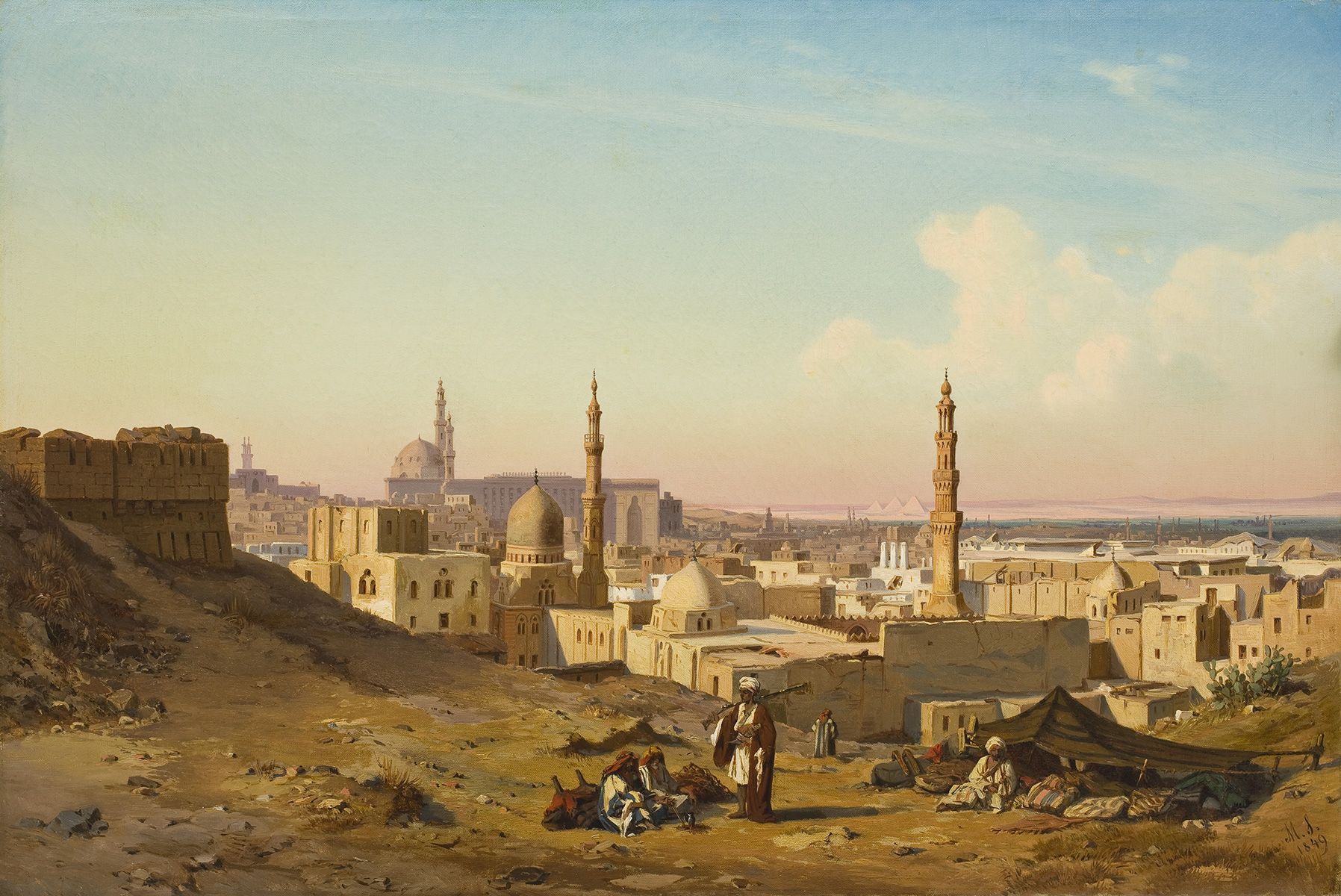
Bedouin Encampment Outside Cairo

Max Schmidt (23 August 1818 – 8 January 1901) was a German landscape painter.

== Biography ==
Schmidt was a native of Berlin, Province of Brandenburg. He studied in the Berlin Art Academy under Carl Joseph Begas and Wilhelm Schirmer. He was largely influenced in his choice of subjects and in his treatment by his familiarity with Egypt and Greece, and paid little heed to German scenes until 1854, but then treated them with rare poetic feeling.

In 1868 he became instructor at the School of Arts in Weimar, and in 1872 went to the Königsberg Academy. His chief works are the Oriental frescoes in the Berlin Museum, “Wood and Mountain” (1868) and “A View on the Spree” (1877), both in the Berlin National Gallery. He wrote Die Aquarellmalerei (Watercolor painting, 7th ed. 1901). He died in Königsberg.

== Sources ==
- Gilman, D. C.; Peck, H. T.; Colby, F. M., eds. (1905). "Schmidt, Max" . New International Encyclopedia (1st ed.). New York: Dodd, Mead.
