= Theodor Hagen (artist) =

German painter

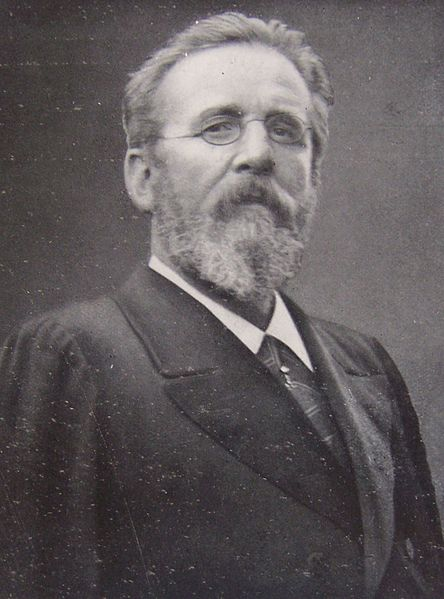
- Born: May 24, 1842; Düsseldorf, German Confederation
- Died: February 12, 1919 (aged 76); Weimar, German Empire
- Education: Kunstakademie Düsseldorf
- Known for: Painting
- Movement: Impressionism
- Patrons: Alfred Lichtwark

Theodor Joseph Hagen (24 May 1842 – 12 February 1919) was a German painter and art teacher.

== Life ==
He was born in Düsseldorf into an old, established Rhenish merchant family. From 1863 to 1868, he studied with Oswald Achenbach at the Kunstakademie Düsseldorf. In 1871, he was summoned to the Weimar Saxon-Grand Ducal Art School to teach landscape painting as a replacement for Max Schmidt, who had left to take another position. Three years later, he received a permanent appointment. He was head of the art department from 1876 to 1881, but grew tired of his administrative duties and returned to teaching. His best-known students were Christian Rohlfs, Hanns Diehl, and Franz Bunke.

He was one of the founders of German Impressionism. After trying out several styles during his early years, he became attracted to the plein-air painting of the French Barbizon School. Through his friendship with Alfred Lichtwark, the first Director of the Kunsthalle Hamburg, he spent some time there, painting scenes of the harbor and the North Sea. From 1893, he was a member of the Munich Secession and, from 1902, the Berlin Secession.

He died in Weimar. A street in Weimar has been named the Theodor-Hagen-Weg in his honor and his home (now Trierer Straße 36) is a municipal monument.

== Selected paintings ==
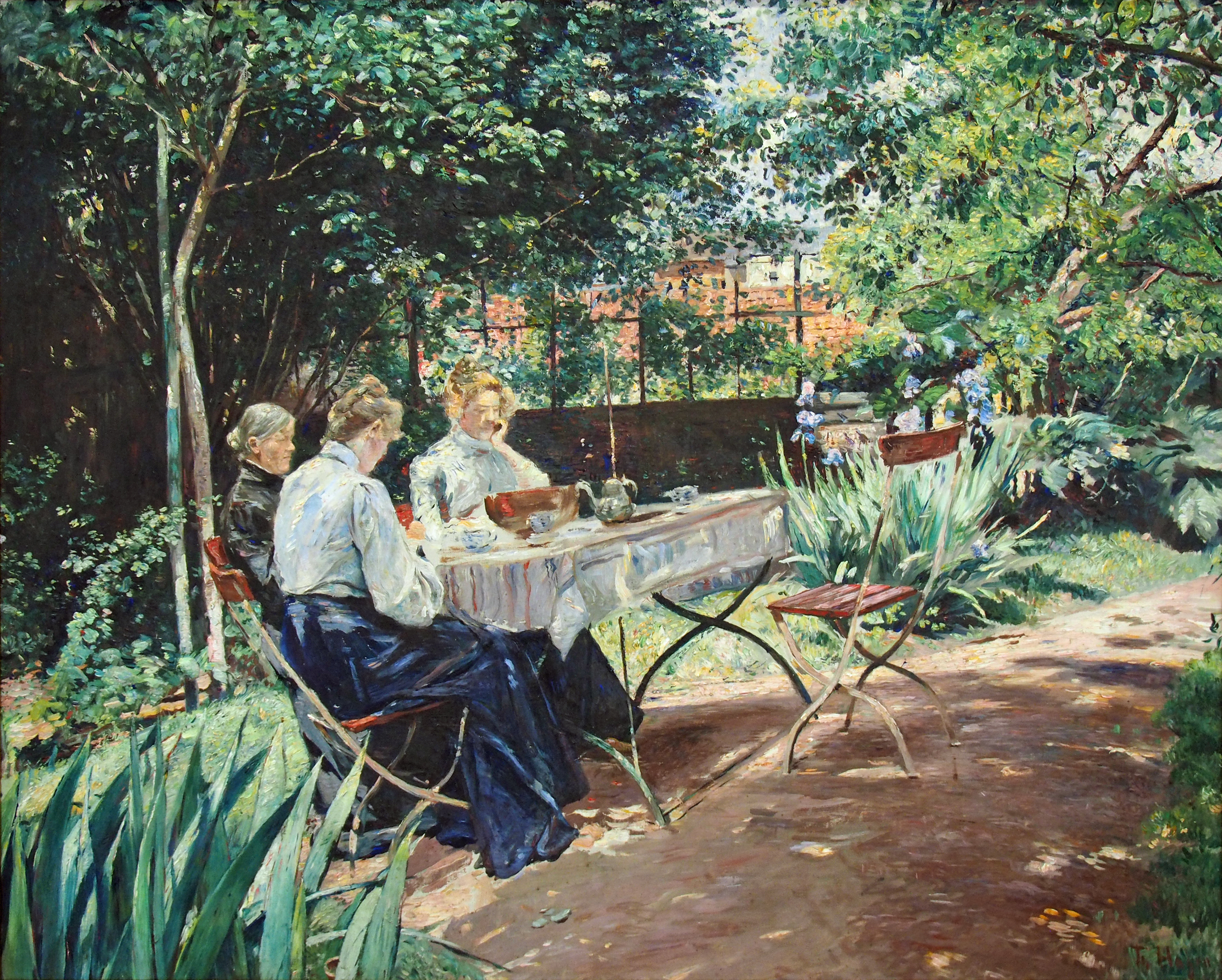
The Artist's Family

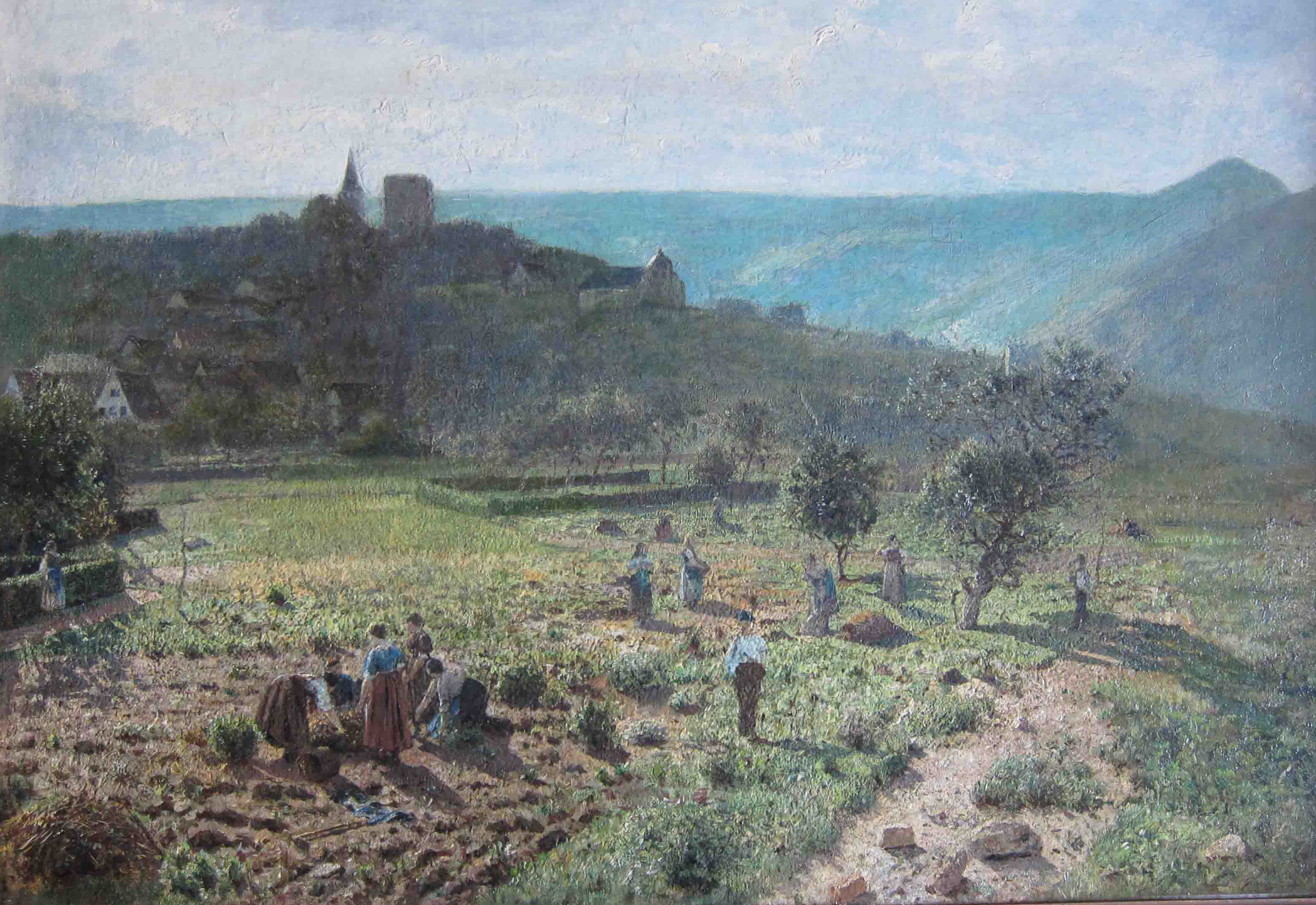
Potato Harvest

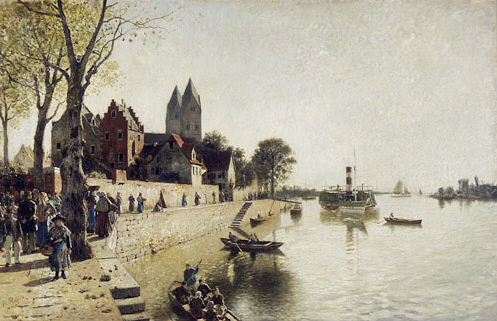
The Rhine at Kaiserswerth

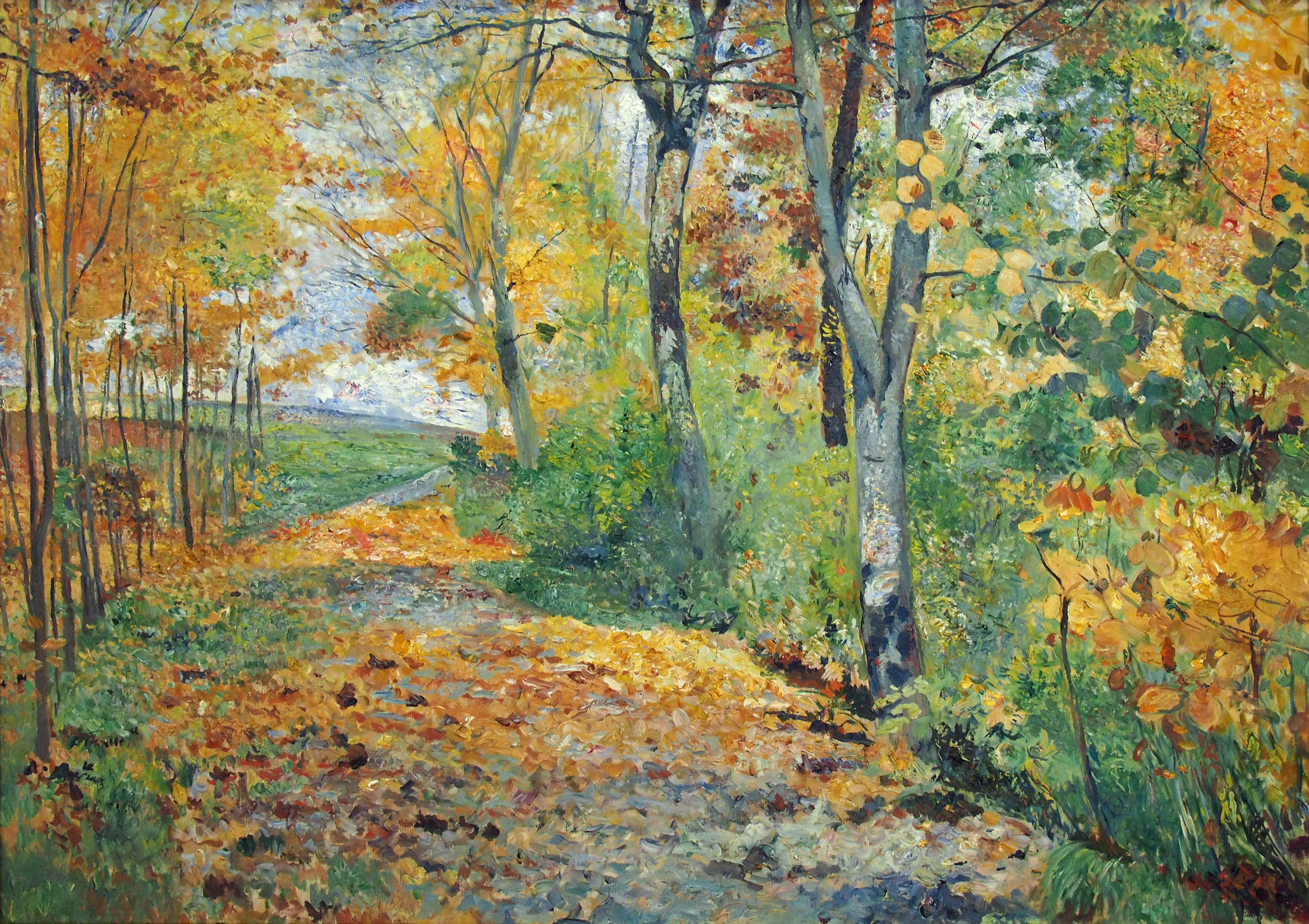
Autumn Forest
