= Große Berliner Kunstausstellung =

Annual Art Exhibition in Berlin (1893–1969)

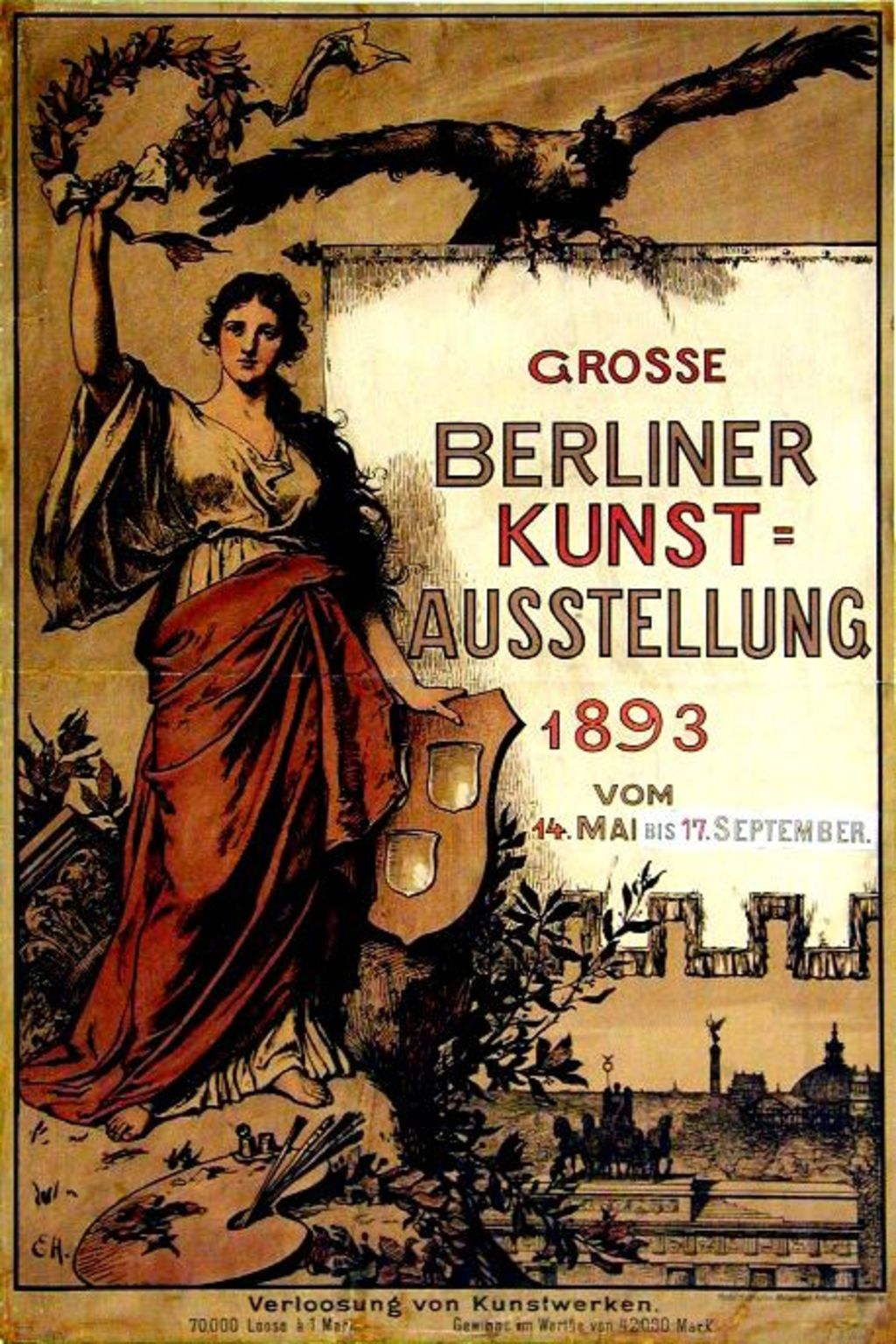
Advertising Poster Great Berlin Art Exhibition 1893 by Ernst Hildebrand, Deutsches Historisches Museum

Große Berliner Kunstausstellung (Great Berlin Art Exhibition), abbreviated GroBeKa or GBK, was an annual art exhibition that existed from 1893 to 1969 with intermittent breaks. In 1917 and 1918, during World War I, it was not held in Berlin but in Düsseldorf. In 1919 and 1920, it operated under the name Kunstausstellung Berlin. From 1970 to 1995, the Freie Berliner Kunstausstellung (Free Berlin Art Exhibition) was held annually in its place.

== The exhibition ==
=== Wilhelminian Era ===
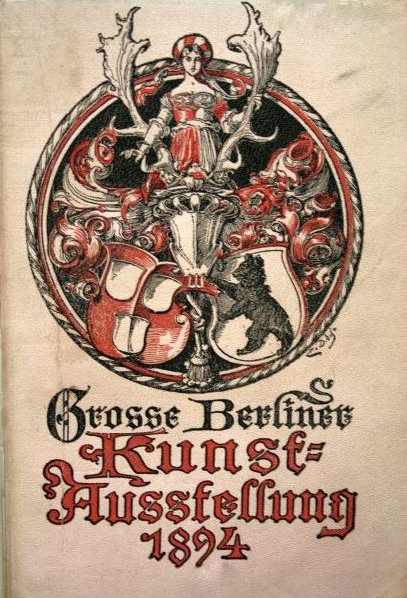
Grosse Berliner Kunstausstellung 1894, Title page of the exhibition catalogue

Until the 1890s, with the exception of the International Art Exhibition of 1891, for more than a hundred years the Fine Arts Section of the Royal Academy of Arts organised and ran the Academic Art Exhibitions. The first Great Berlin Art Exhibition took place in 1893 on the basis of the statutes of a reorganisation of its internal relations, which was approved by Kaiser Wilhelm II. From then on, the entirety of the Berlin artistic community was to take over the art exhibition, represented by the Cooperative of the Members of the Royal Academy of Arts (Genossenschaft der Mitglieder der Königlichen Akademie der Künste) and the Berlin Artist's Association (Verein Berliner Künstler). The Düsseldorf artists' association was also granted a share in the management of the exhibition. On 14 May 1893, the Prussian Minister of Culture Robert Bosse opened the first Great Berlin Art Exhibition. This and subsequent exhibitions were held in the Glass Palace, the exhibition building of the State Exhibition Park at Lehrter Bahnhof.

In 1896, to celebrate the bicentenary of the Royal Academy of Arts, the International Art Exhibition and the Berlin Trade Exhibition were held in the exhibition building, the adjacent building and the State Exhibition Park instead of the Great Berlin Art Exhibition.

It is disputed whether in 1898, the jury of the Great Berlin Art Exhibition had rejected the landscape painting Grunewaldsee by the painter Walter Leistikow and whether this had been, among other things, the reason for the founding of the Berlin Secession. In order to raise the long-lamented average standard of this exhibition, the jury had rejected around 1500 works, i.e. one-third of the works submitted. Walter Leistikow's pictures, however, were not affected by this. All of his submitted paintings were accepted.

At the beginning of May 1898, 65 artists founded the Berlin Secession, as a consequence of current and earlier discord with the Verein Berliner Künstler. For the most part, the members did not take part in the Great Berlin Art Exhibition for a while from 1899 onwards and showed their works in a building in Kantstraße in secession-owned exhibitions.

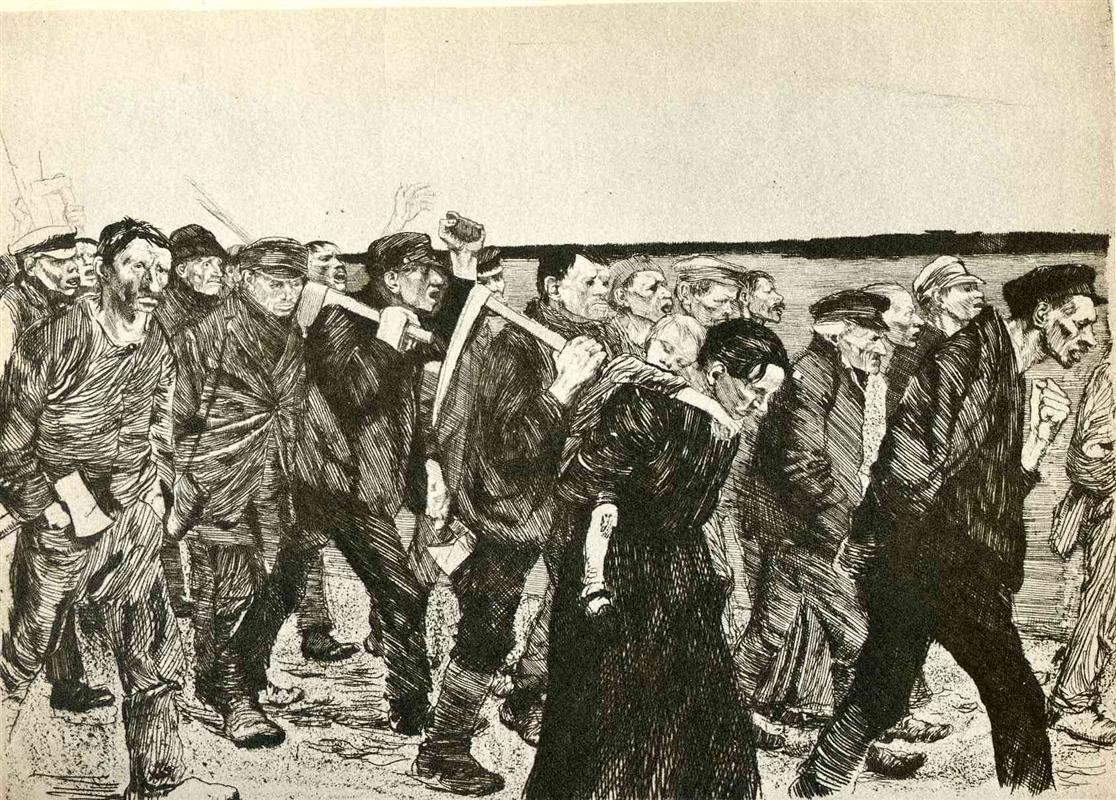
The March of the Weavers in Berlin, 1897

The artist and printmaker Käthe Kollwitz was nominated for a gold medal by the jury of the Great Berlin Art Exhibition for her cycle A Weavers' Revolt, but Kaiser Wilhelm II probably considered the works too socially critical, and he prevented the medal from being awarded in 1898. In 1900, 16 of the 24 works by the sculptor and painter Gustav Eberlein on display, fell victim to censorship and were removed from the exhibition by "the highest instruction", including the works Adam and Eve at the End of Life, The Spirit of Bismarck, and Workers (also Sack Bearers).

In 1905, the Berlin Association of Artists (Werkring) and the Association for House and Apartment Art (Vereinigung für Haus und Wohnungskunst) were represented in the exhibition, and in 1908 the Dresden artists' group Die Elbier. In 1912, the opening speech was given by Max Schlichting, who used the situation to draw attention to artistic freedom: "In contrast to private exhibitions, an exhibition supported by the state has the obligation to promote all artistic endeavors equally, and its assistance is open to anyone who wishes to call upon it for his or her person.

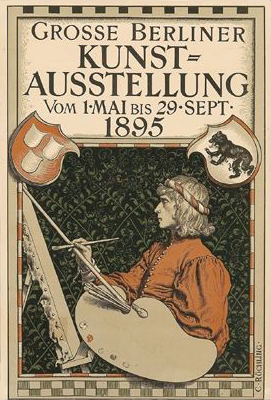
An advertising poster at the Great Berlin Art Exhibition 1895 by Carl Röchling

In 1913, on the occasion of the Emperor's jubilee, the exhibition entitled Große Berliner Kunstausstellung zum Regierungsjubiläum Seiner Majestät des Kaisers (Great Berlin Art Exhibition on the Anniversary of the Reign of His Majesty the Emperor) was held. The wish to include the Berlin Secession in this Great Berlin Art Exhibition, with its own jury and halls, was not fulfilled. The Berlin Secession declined the invitation.

As the exhibition building of the Landesausstellungspark was used for military purposes due to the First World War, the Great Berlin Art Exhibition took place in 1915 in the exhibition building at the Palais Arnim of the Royal Academy of Arts on Pariser Platz with a smaller exhibition area. In order to be able to show at least about 600 works, the exhibition was divided into two stages. 300 works were on display during the first half of the exhibition period and 300 more during the second half.

The exhibition in 1916, again in the Glaspalast, was almost entirely dominated by the war. There were three categories: The War Pictures Exhibition, the Portrait Gallery: "Great Men from Great Times" and the General Art Exhibition, whereby in the latter, which was divided into five groups, the Association of German illustrators (Verband Deutscher Illustratoren) also had "Political Caricature and War Humour" as its leading theme. On 15 September, Herwarth Walden criticised this exhibition in his article Der Vergessene Kern (The Forgotten Core) in the journal Der Sturm, which he edited.

In 1917 as well as in 1918, the Great Berlin Art Exhibition was moved to the Kunstpalast Düsseldorf. Artists of the Berlin Secession and artists of the Free Secession were also included. In 1917, new acquisitions from the municipal art collections in Düsseldorf were also exhibited and in 1918, on the occasion of the 80th birthday of the painter and professor at the Düsseldorf Art Academy, Eduard von Gebhardt, his works from collections and private collections were exhibited. Konrad Haenisch and Max Schlichting worked on a reform of the exhibition in 1918.

=== Weimar Republic ===
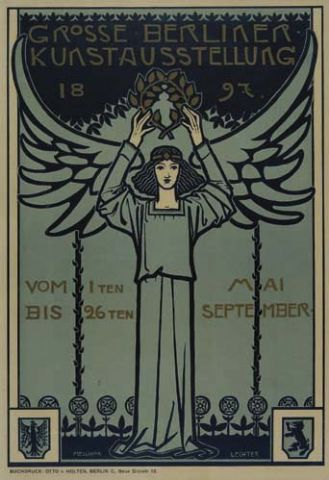
Advertising Poster Great Berlin Art Exhibition 1897 by Melchior Lechter, Symbolism

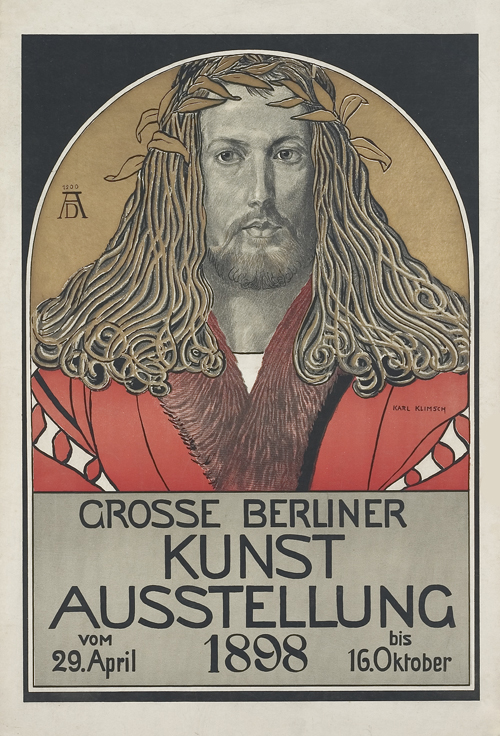
Advertising poster Great Berlin Art Exhibition 1898 by Karl Ferdinand Klimsch, after the self-portrait by Albrecht Dürer

In 1919, at the beginning of the Weimar Republic, the exhibition was held under the name Kunstausstellung Berlin in the newly renovated Glaspalast (Glaspalast) in the Landesausstellungpark, as it was in 1920, but in 1921 it was again called the Große Berliner Kunstausstellung. The exhibition was now sponsored by the government of the new republic and had been reorganised. The Association of Berlin Artists (Verein Berliner Künstler), Berliner Secession, Freie Secession and the Novembergruppe were represented, but separately, each with its own jury and its own rooms.

On 14 May 1921, Reich President Friedrich Ebert opened the Great Berlin Art Exhibition. The Berlin Secession was not represented at this exhibition. In September 1922, the lithograph Sentimental Sailor and the watercolour Patriotic Travelling Theatre by the artist Georg Scholz were declared "lewd" in the November Group section and confiscated. The following year, Ebert and Hans Baluschek spoke at the opening event.

In 1927, the exhibition was run for the first time by the Kartell der vereinigten Verbände Bildender Künstler Berlin. The Cartel had been founded to do justice to the interests of all artists. The exhibition commission was composed of one representative each from various groups and associations, namely the Allgemeine deutsche Kunstgenossenschaft, Ortsverein Berlin (General German Art Cooperative, Berlin chapter), the architects' association Der Ring, the Berlin Secession, the international association of expressionists, futurists, cubists and constructivists Die Abstrakten, the Freie Vereinigung der Graphiker zu Berlin (Association of Graphics Artists of Berlin), the Künstlervereinigung Berliner Bildhauer (Artists' Association of Berlin Sculptors), the November Group, the Verein Berliner Künstler, the Verein der Berliner Künstlerinnen (Association of Berlin Women Artists) and the Frauen-Kunstverband (Women's Art Association). There was also a representative for the artists who did not belong to any of the cartel's associations. The 1927 exhibition included a special exhibition of paintings by Kazimir Malevich. Since Malevich had to return to the Soviet Union early, he gave the pictures to Hugo Häring for safekeeping in his function as treasurer of the exhibition. On the one hand, Malevich hoped for further sales, on the other for a return to Berlin. The pictures embarked on an "odyssey" and never returned to Russia. Of the 73 paintings exhibited, 18 works are now considered lost.

On 12 July 1928, the "Führer" of the Nazi Party and former art painter Adolf Hitler visited the exhibition, where Expressionist, Futurist, Cubist, Constructivist and New Objectivity works were shown, among others, works that ran counter to his understanding of art, therefore did not correspond to the Nazi ideal of German art and were later branded as Degenerate Art when the Nazi Party seized power in 1933.

Due to the dilapidation of the Glass Palace in the Exhibition Park, Bellevue Palace served as the exhibition venue from 1929. The director of the exhibition from then on was Hans Baluschek.

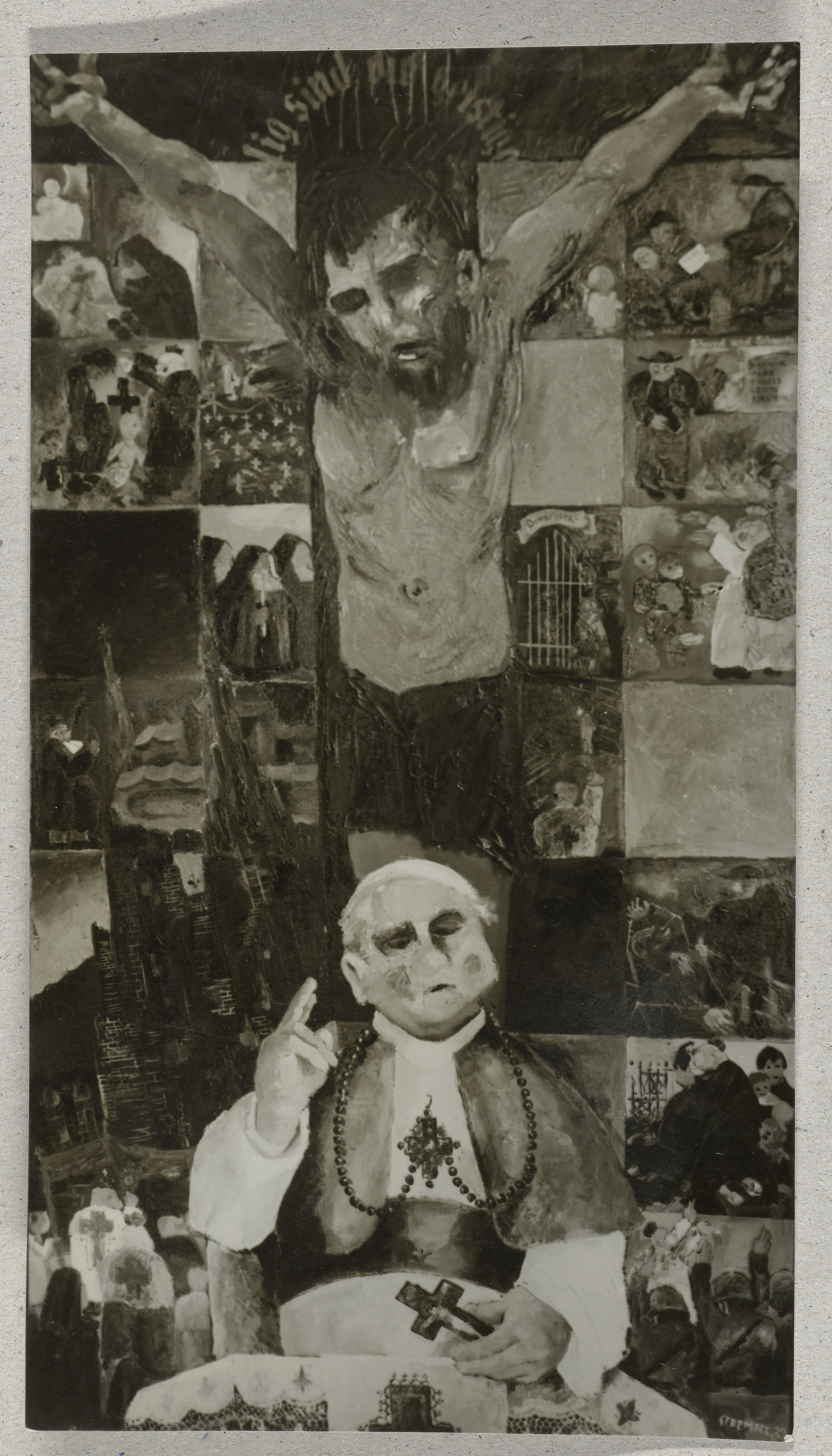
Selig sind die geistig Armen by Horst Strempel

In 1930, most of the works submitted by the Dadaist and painter of Berlin nightlife Christian Schad were rejected. A year later, the painting § 218 by Alice Lex-Nerlinger, the wife of Oskar Nerlinger, was confiscated by the police during the exhibition. The controversial painting Selig sind die geistig Armen by Horst Strempel was removed from the exhibition in 1932.

=== German Reich 1933 to 1945 ===
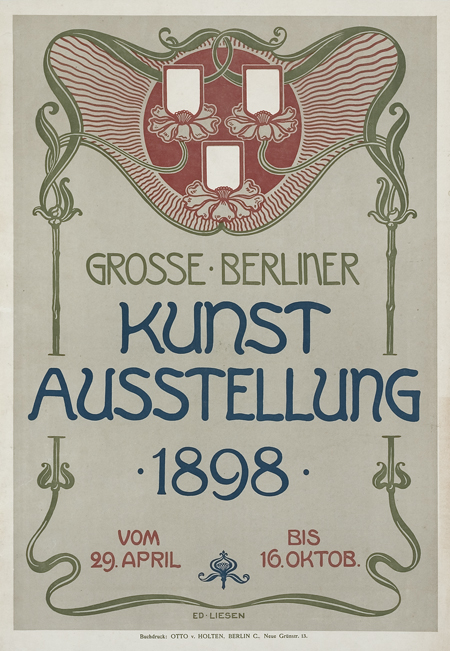
Advertising Poster Great Berlin Art Exhibition 1898 by Eduard Liesen, Art Nouveau

Already in the early days of National Socialism, the Nazis removed Hans Baluschek from his post as exhibition director in 1933 as a so-called "Marxist artist" and later banned him from working and exhibiting. They ostracised his works, classing them as "degenerate". However, between 1933 and 1934, his paintings were still exhibited at the Great Berlin Art Exhibition. The opening speech was given by the Prussian Minister of Culture Bernhard Rust. Excluded from the board of the Association of Berlin Women Artists, prominent Jewish artist Harriet von Rathlef withdrew her works from the Great Berlin Art Exhibition in Bellevue Palace as a consequence of the increasing anti-Semitic riots and the art policy of the Nazis. The exhibition for the year 1934 was presented in the exhibition rooms of the Prussian Academy of Arts, and works by Gustav Wunderwald were rejected.

In 1936, Georg Netzband was banned from exhibiting because of "political unreliability".

In 1940, during the Second World War, the exhibition was shown in the new exhibition hall of the Haus der Kunst at Hardenbergstraße 21-23. The previous Haus der Kunst at Königsplatz 4 had been demolished.

In 1942, the exhibition was held in the Nationalgalerie. For the propagandistic documentary film Sommersonntag in Berlin of 1942, produced by the Die Deutsche Wochenschau and lasting about thirteen minutes, about thirty seconds of footage were shot in and in front of the Great Berlin Art Exhibition in 35mm film format. After about two minutes of the film, the shots of the Great Berlin Art Exhibition follow. The sculpture shown in close-up in it is the Water Bearer by Walter Hauschild.

=== Federal Republic of Germany ===
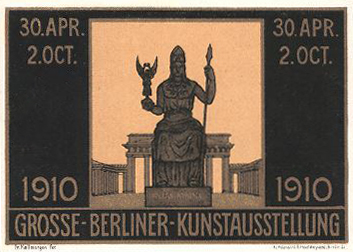
Advertising postcard Great Berlin Art Exhibition 1910, by Friedrich Kallmorgen

On 25 May 1956, the first Great Berlin Art Exhibition since the war, was opened in the exhibition halls at the Berlin Radio Tower. The exhibition was organised by the Berufsverband Bildender Künstler Berlin (Professional Association of Visual Artists Berlin). The artist, colour designer, the avant-garde author of children's books, Lou Scheper-Berkenkamp was from then on jointly responsible for the design of the exhibitions. On the occasion of the 40th anniversary of Waldemar Rösler's death, works by him were shown.

In 1958, the then Mayor of West Berlin Willy Brandt and Federal President Theodor Heuss were present at the opening. In 1961, Paul Ohnsorge was awarded the Grand Prize of the Berlin Art Exhibition for his complete works by Willy Brandt in the presence of former Federal President Theodor Heuss.

The last Great Berlin Art Exhibition took place in 1969.

== Selection of exhibiting artists ==
=== Wilhelminian Era ===
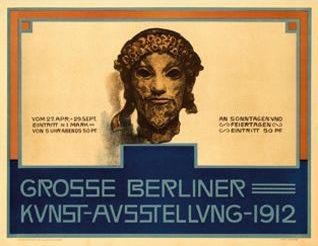
Advertising postcard Great Berlin Art Exhibition 1912, by Hans Looschen

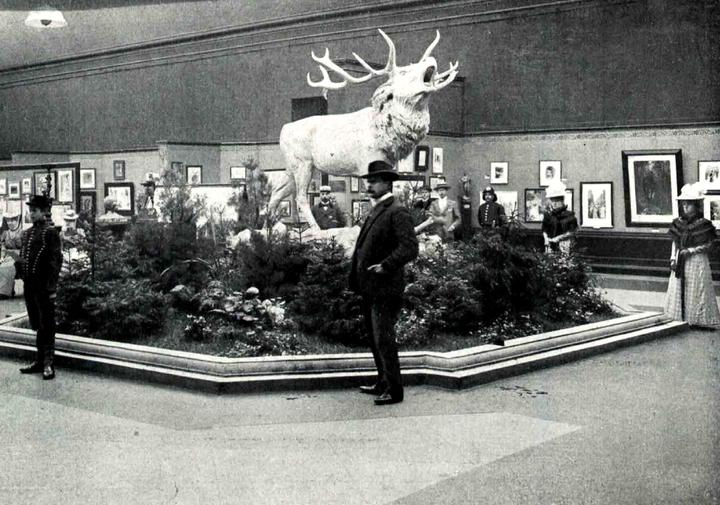
Plaster model Schreiender Hirsch (Screaming Stag) by Richard Rusche (1 ⅓ life size) at the Great Berlin Art Exhibition 1899

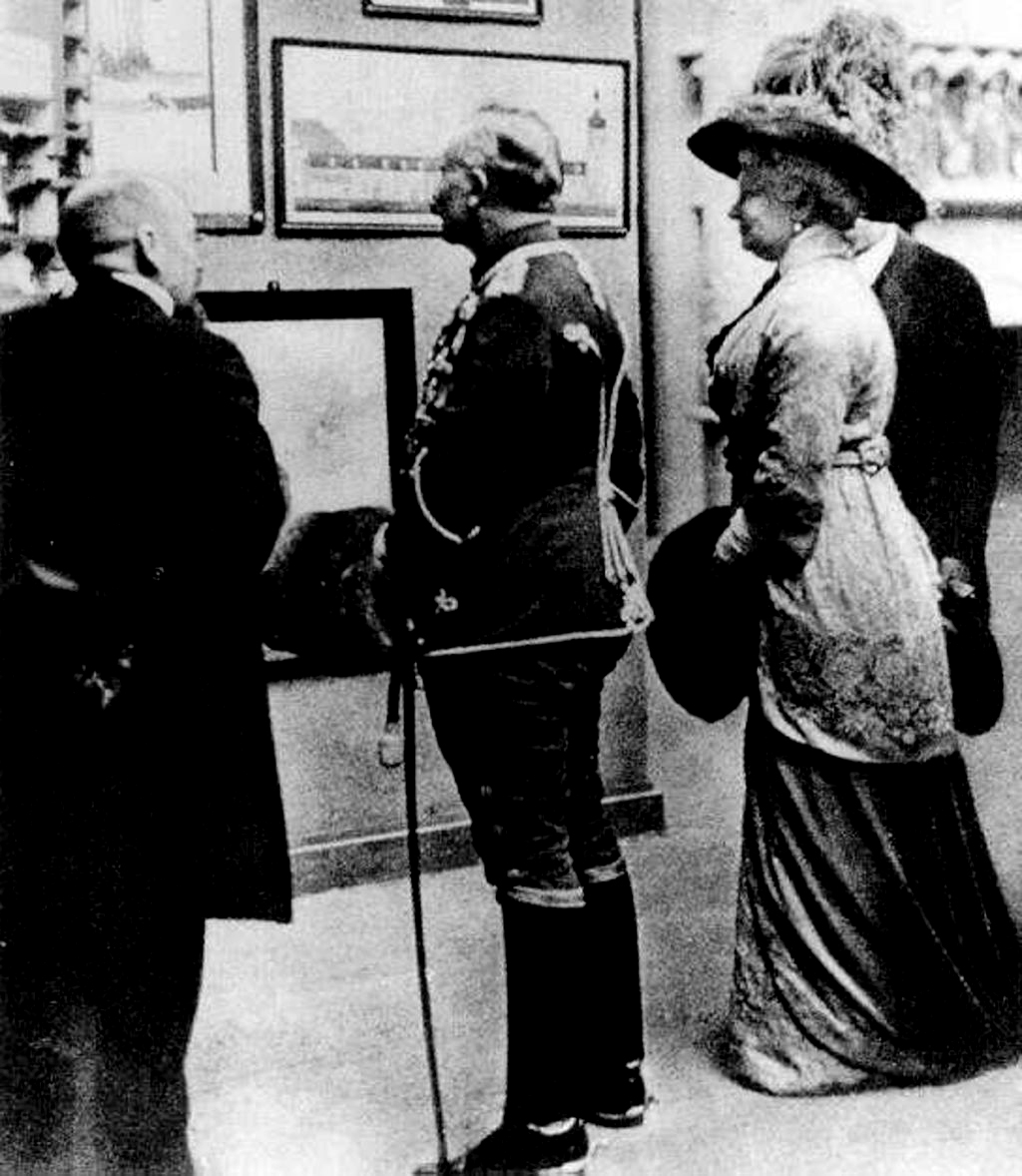
Emperor Wilhelm II and Empress Auguste Viktoria at the Great Berlin Art Exhibition on the Occasion of the Jubilee of the Reign of His Majesty the Emperor, 1913

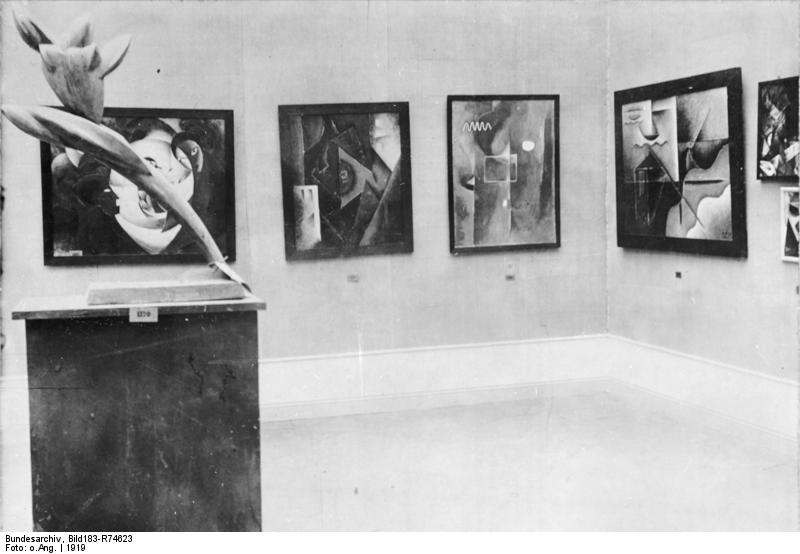
View of the November Group Hall, Great Berlin Art Exhibition 1919, German Federal Archives

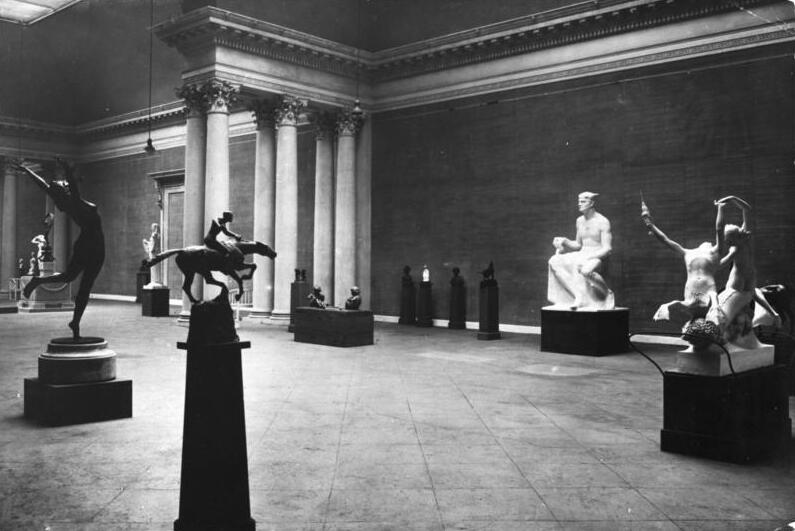
View of the Sculpture Hall, Great Berlin Art Exhibition 1920, German Federal Archives

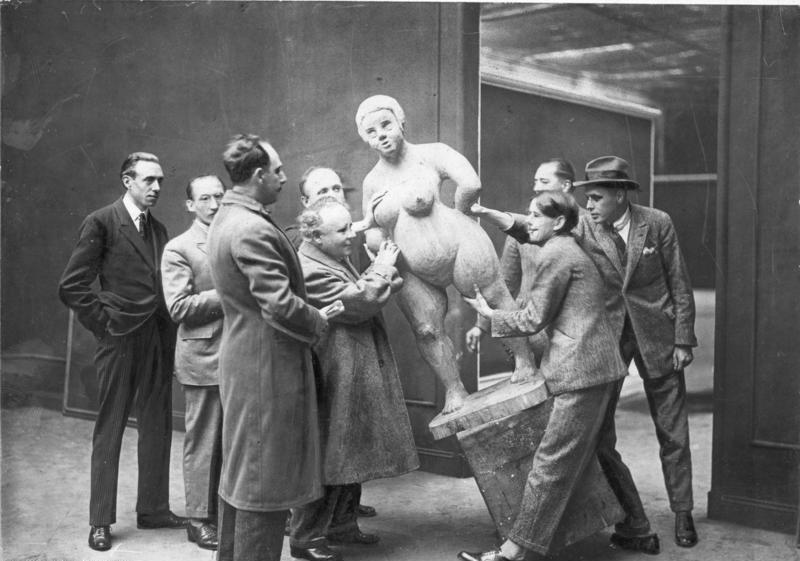
Installation of the sculpture (lime wood) Female Nude by Christoph Voll in a room of the November Group, Great Berlin Art Exhibition 1924, German Federal Archives

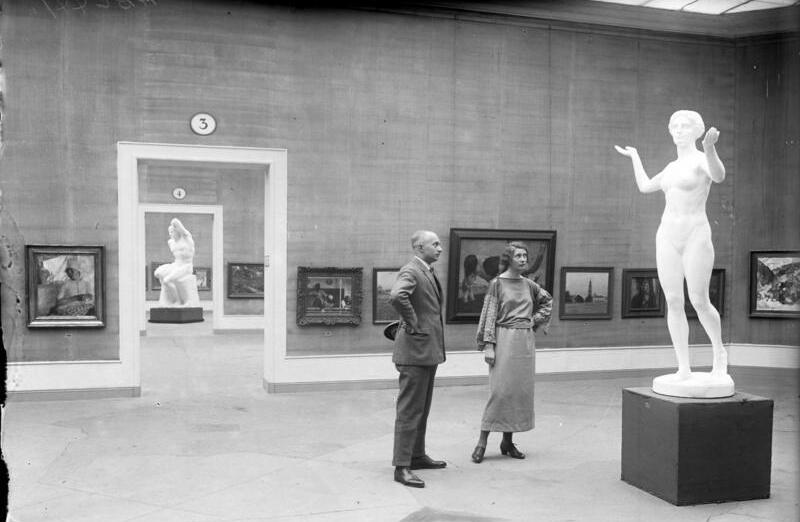
Day of the opening of the Great Berlin Art Exhibition on 31 May 1924, German Federal Archives

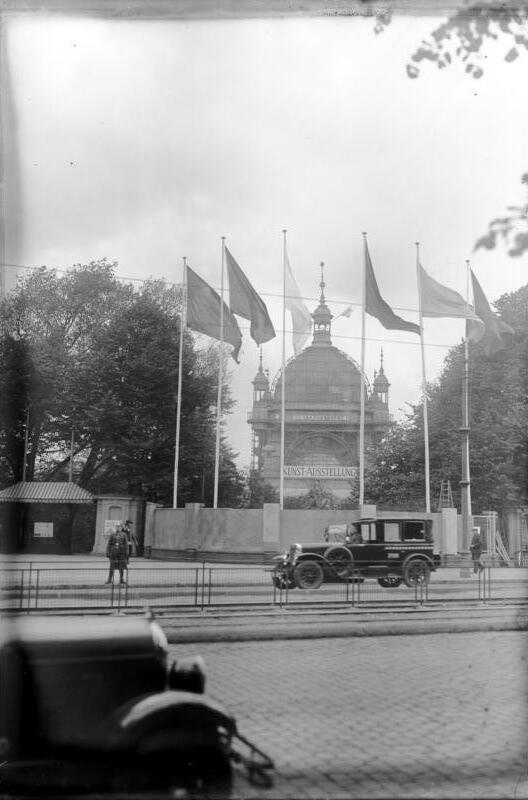
View of the exhibition building of the Great Berlin Art Exhibition 1928 at Lehrter Bahnhof, German Federal Archives

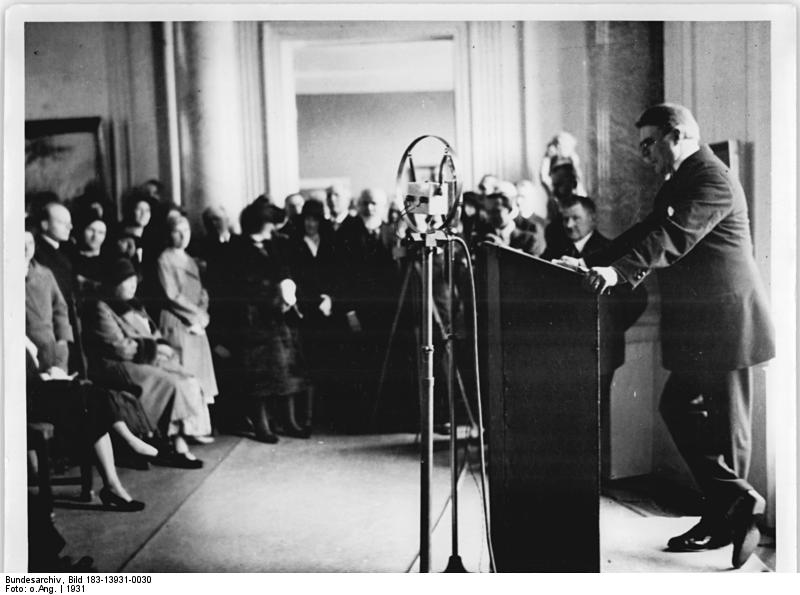
Opening speech by Hans Baluschek at the Great Berlin Art Exhibition 1931 in Bellevue Palace, German Federal Archives

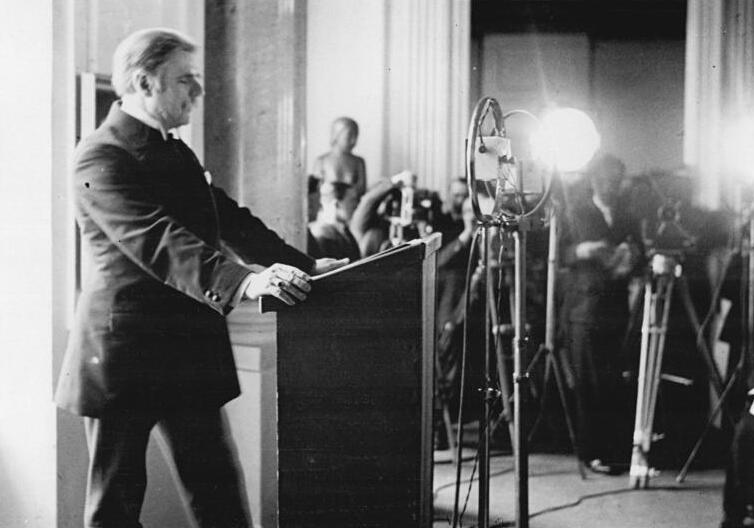
Opening speech by Hans Baluschek with members of the press in the background at the Great Berlin Art Exhibition 1931 in Bellevue Palace, German Federal Archives

- 1893: One large gold medal each was awarded to: Mark Antokolsky, Peter Janssen and Hermann Prell and one small gold medal for each of Franz Eisenhut, Josef Flossmann, Johannes Götz, James Guthrie, Eduard Kaempffer and Heinrich von Zügel.

Other exhibiting artists included Ernst Bernardien, Mathilde Block, Olga Boznańska, Ludwig Brunow, Eugène Carrière, Lovis Corinth, Hans Dahl, Rudolf Eichstaedt, Wilhelm Feldmann, Anna Gerresheim, Gustav Graef, Hugo von Habermann, Otto Heichert, Hermann Hendrich, Heinrich Hermanns, Hermann Hirsch, Adolf Hölzel, Adolf Jahn, Max Klein, Max Klinger, Käthe Kollwitz, Max Koner, Hugo Lederer, Walter Leistikow, Franz von Lenbach, Emmy Lischke, Vilma Lwoff-Parlaghy, Ascan Lutteroth, Fritz Mackensen, Carl Malchin, Adolph von Menzel, Otto Modersohn, Karl Lorenz Rettich, Hugo Rheinhold, Fritz Roeber, Franz Skarbina, Franz von Stuck, Hans Thoma, Fritz von Uhde, Max Unger, Theodor Wedepohl, Julius Wengel, Hugo Zieger and Emil Zschimmer.

- 1894 Each received a large gold medal: Max Koner, Elisabeth Vilma Lwoff-Parlaghy and José Villegas Cordero and a small gold medal each for Peter Breuer, Ludwig Dettmann, Rudolf Eichstaedt, Rudolf Maison, Franz Schwechten, Paul Wallot and Bertha Wegmann.

Other exhibiting artists included Olga Boznańska, Ludwig Brunow, Walter Crane, Hans Dahl, Elisabeth von Eicken, Wilhelm Feldmann, Johannes Götz, Georg von Hauberrisser, Hermann Hendrich, Heinrich Hermanns, Arthur Illies, Adolf Jahn, Eduard Kaempffer, Walter Leistikow, Emmy Lischke, Ascan Lutteroth, Carl Malchin, Gabriel von Max, Adolph von Menzel Otto Modersohn, Karl Josef Müller, Fritz Prölß, Karl Lorenz Rettich, Hugo Richter-Lefensdorf, Franz Skarbina, Franz von Stuck, Fritz Sturm, Max Unger and Theodor Wedepohl

- 1895: One large gold medal each was awarded to Jules Clément Chaplain, Ferdinand von Harrach, Wilhelm Leibl and Ferdinand Roybet and a small gold medal each for each of Emilio Bisi, Giovanni Boldini, Wilhelm Feldmann, Arthur von Ferraris, T. Alexander Harrison, Georg von Hauberrisser, Otto Heichert, Franz Roubaud, John Singer Sargent and Paul Schroeter.

Other exhibiting artists included Alfred Agache, Mathilde Block, William-Adolphe Bouguereau, Olga Boznańska, Edward Burne-Jones, Eugène Carrière, Józef Chełmoński, Walter Crane, Wilhelm Dürr, Elisabeth von Eicken, Ernst Eitner, Julian Fałat, Henri Fantin-Latour, Wilhelm Feldmann, Hermann Hendrich, Adolf Hölzel, Theodor Hummel, Arthur Illies, Adolf Jahn, Eduard Kaempffer, Albert von Keller, Hugo Lederer, Frederic Leighton, Walter Leistikow, Franz von Lenbach, Emmy Lischke, Ascan Lutteroth, Robert Macbeth, Frederick William MacMonnies, Carl Malchin, Adolph von Menzel, John Everett Millais, Max Nonnenbruch, Fritz Prölß, Pierre Puvis de Chavannes, Karl Lorenz Rettich, Hugo Richter-Lefensdorf, James Sant, Franz Skarbina, Max Slevogt, Franz von Stuck, Fritz Sturm, Hans Thoma, Max Unger, Carl Vinnen, John William Waterhouse, Theodor Wedepohl and Julius Wengel.

- 1896: Internationale Kunstausstellung. One large gold medal each was awarded to: George Hendrik Breitner, Évariste Carpentier, Adolf Echtler, Edward Onslow Ford, Pietro Fragiacomo, Oskar Frenzel, Gotthardt Kuehl, Jef Lambeaux, Michel Lock, Ludwig Manzel, Carl von Marr, Josef Václav Myslbek, Kazimierz Pochwalski, Agustí Querol Subirats, Julius Carl Raschdorff, Georg von Rosen, Otto Sinding, Joaquín Sorolla, Julius LeBlanc Stewart and Anders Zorn and a small gold medal each for Verner Åkerman, Laura Theresa Alma-Tadema, Aleksander Augustynowicz, Rudolf Bacher, Hans Bachmann, Fritz Baer, Carl Bantzer, Carl Becker, Willy von Beckerath, Carl Blos, Minca Bosch Reitz, Franz Bunke, Vincenzo Caprile, Filippo Cifariello, Carel Lodewijk Dake, Alois Delug, Arturo Faldi, Fritz Fleischer, Georg Frentzen, Walter Gay, Thomas Cooper Gotch, Willy Hamacher, George Hitchcock, Jean de la Hoese, Erich Hösel, Ludwig von Hofmann, Ernst Josephson, George William Joy, Sophie Koner, Alfred Kowalski, Wilhelm Krauskopf, Carl Larsson, Cornelius Van Leemputten, Konrad Lessing, Bruno Liljefors, Ricardo de los Ríos, Fritz Mackensen, Adolf Maennchen, Vladimir Makovsky, Alfred Messel, Ludwig Michalek, Carl Moll, Rudolf Otto von Ottenfeld, Pierre Jean van der Ouderaa, Charles Johann Palmié, Hans von Petersen, Otto Petri, George Poggenbeek, Ilya Repin, Caspar Ritter, Augusto Rivalta, Léo-Paul Robert, Veloso Salgado, Jacques Matthias Schenker, Johann Scherpe, Stefan Schwartz, Adalbert Seligmann, Viktor Simov, António Teixeira Lopes, Hans Temple, Frits Thaulow, Friedrich von Thiersch, Eduard Veith, Ernest Waterlow and Henry Woods.

Other exhibiting artists included: Lawrence Alma-Tadema, Ernst Bernardien, Marie Bilders-van Bosse, Olga Boznańska, Józef Chełmoński, John Collier, Lovis Corinth, Walter Crane, Elisabeth von Eicken, Ernst Eitner, Eugen von Schweden, Johannes Götz, Julian Fałat, Henri Fantin-Latour, Hugo Lederer, Ferdinand von Harrach, Hermann Hendrich, Heinrich Hermanns, Adolf Jahn, Fernand Khnopff, Walter Leistikow, Madeleine Lemaire, Franz von Lenbach, Emmy Lischke, Maria Lübbes, Ascan Lutteroth, Fritz Mackensen, Edvard Munch, Max Nonnenbruch, Franz Skarbina, Max Unger and Theodor Wedepohl. In the Historical Department, among others, works by Lawrence Alma-Tadema, Arnold Böcklin, Peter von Cornelius, Friedrich Geselschap, Ferdinand von Harrach, Wilhelm Leibl, Franz von Lenbach, Adolph von Menzel, Franz Skarbina and Karl Friedrich Schinkel were shown.

- 1897: One large gold medal each was awarded to: Peter Breuer, Richard Friese and Max Liebermann and a small gold medal each for Fritz Heinemann, Albert Hertel, Otto March, Georg Ludwig Meyn, Hugo Mühlig and René Reinicke.

Other exhibiting artists included Karl Bartoschek, Ernst Bernardien, Mathilde Block, Olga Boznańska, Olga Cordes, Hans Dahl, Gustav Eberlein, Elisabeth von Eicken, Henri Fantin-Latour, Anna Gerresheim, Hermann Hendrich, Heinrich Hermanns, Carl Langhein, Hugo Lederer, Walter Leistikow, Franz von Lenbach, Ascan Lutteroth, Carl Malchin, Otto Modersohn, Fritz Overbeck, Karl Lorenz Rettich, Hugo Richter-Lefensdorf, Martha Rose-Grabow, Franz Skarbina, Fritz Sturm and Theodor Wedepohl.

- 1898: One large gold medal each was awarded to: Bruno Schmitz and Pierre Charles van der Stappen and a small gold medal each for Hans Everding, Luděk Marold, Bernhard Winter, Martin Wolff and Karl Ziegler.

Other exhibiting artists included: Hans am Ende, Ernst Barlach, Olga Boznańska, Lovis Corinth, Walter Crane, Hans Dahl, Karl Gussow, Ferdinand von Harrach, Hermann Hendrich, Heinrich Hermanns, Ferdinand Hodler, Theodor Hummel, Adolf Jahn, Käthe Kollwitz, Carl Larsson, Hugo Lederer, Walter Leistikow, Franz von Lenbach, Max Liebermann, Emmy Lischke, Ascan Lutteroth, Fritz Mackensen, Carl Malchin, Max Nonnenbruch, Fritz Overbeck, Hermann Prell, Karl Lorenz Rettich, Franz Skarbina, Max Slevogt, Franz von Stuck, Fritz Sturm, Max Unger and Heinrich Vogeler.

- 1899: Hans Meyer (collective exhibition) and Joseph Scheurenberg (collective exhibition) each received a large gold medal and Gonzalo Bilbao, Isidor Kaufmann, Wojciech Kossak, Friedrich von Schennis (collective exhibition), Julius Schmid, Louis Tuaillon, Hermann Vogel and Vollmer & Jassoy (architectural community) each received a small gold medal.

Other exhibiting artists included: Lawrence Alma-Tadema, Mathilde Block, Hans Bohrdt (Kollektivausstellung), Olga Boznańska, Carl Breitbach (Collective exhibition), Hans Dahl, Louis Douzette, Carl Flamm, Carl Gehrts (Kollektivausstellung), Karl Gussow, Stanisław Grocholski, Ernst Hausmann (Collective exhibition), Heinrich Hermanns, Adolf Jahn, Wilhelm Leibl, Franz von Lenbach, Emmy Lischke, Maria Lübbes, Ascan Lutteroth, Adolph von Menzel, Francesco Paolo Michetti (Kollektiv-Ausstellung), Max Nonnenbruch, Max Rabes (Collective exhibition), Karl Lorenz Rettich, Hugo Richter-Lefensdorf, Richard Rusche, Teutwart Schmitson (Collective exhibition), Franz Skarbina, Fritz Sturm, Hans Thoma and Theodor Wedepohl.

- 1900: One large gold medal each was awarded to: Hans Herrmann, Cornelius Van Leemputten and Hugo Vogel (Special Exhibition) and a small gold medal each for Luigi Bazzani, Ludwig Cauer, Andreas Dirks, Berthold Genzmer, Carl Jacoby, Paul Joanovits, Ludwig Kühn and Emil Oestermann.

Other exhibiting artists included: Ernst Barlach, Ernst Bernardien, Olga Boznańska, Eugen Bracht (Special Exhibition), Fanny Brate, Moritz Coschell, Walter Crane, Hans Dahl, Jean Delville, Gustav Eberlein, Jean-Léon Gérôme, Ferdinand von Harrach, Heinrich Hermanns, Franz von Lenbach, Maria Lübbes, Ascan Lutteroth, Anders Montan, Max Nonnenbruch, Karl Rudolf Sohn, Fritz Sturm, Heinrich Vogeler, Paul Vorgang (Special Exhibition) and Emile Wauters (Special Exhibition).

- 1901: One large gold medal each was awarded to: Robert Diez, Wilhelm Haverkamp and Fritz Schaper and jeweils eine kleine Goldmedaille Albert Aublet, Hans Bohrdt, Adolf Hirémy-Hirschl, Ludwig Hoffmann, Ferdinand Schmutzer and Ernst Wenck.

Other exhibiting artists included: August Achtenhagen, Ernst Barlach, Mathilde Block, Olga Boznańska, Moritz Coschell, Hans Dahl, Elisabeth von Eicken, Max Frey, Heinrich Hermanns, Adolf Jahn, Erich Kips, Franz von Lenbach (Special Exhibition), Emmy Lischke, Ascan Lutteroth, Adolph von Menzel, Alfred Mohrbutter, József Rippl-Rónai, Karl Lorenz Rettich, Heinrich Schlotermann, Franz von Stuck, Fritz Sturm, Heinrich Vogeler and Hedwig Weiß.

- 1902: One large gold medal each was awarded to: Arthur Kampf and Wilhelm von Rümann and a small gold medal each for Karl Theodor Boehme, Pietro Canonica, Otto Heinrich Engel, Hans Grässel, Hermann Hartwig, Alexander Koester and Jules Lagae.

Other exhibiting artists included: Mathilde Block, Moritz Coschell, Hans Dahl, Elisabeth von Eicken, Karl Gussow, Ferdinand von Harrach, Heinrich Hermanns, Adolf Jahn, Franz von Lenbach, Emmy Lischke, Rudolf Marcuse, Alfred Mohrbutter, Paul Müller-Kaempff, Max Nonnenbruch, Karl Lorenz Rettich, Heinrich Schlotermann Fritz Sturm and Julie Wolfthorn.

- 1903: One large gold medal each was awarded to: Carl Bantzer, Adolf Brütt and John Singer Sargent and a small gold medal each for Edwin Austin Abbey, Fritz Burger, von Hoven & Neher (Bauräte), Hugo Lederer, Ferdinand Lepcke and Carl Vinnen.

Other exhibiting artists included: Lawrence Alma-Tadema, Hans am Ende, Ernst Bernardien, Alexander Essfeld, Paul Cézanne, William Merritt Chase, Moritz Coschell, Walter Crane, Hans Dahl, Elisabeth von Eicken, James Ensor, Ferdinand von Harrach, Heinrich Hermanns, Johan Barthold Jongkind, Fernand Khnopff, Emmy Lischke, Ascan Lutteroth, Rudolf Marcuse, Claude Monet, Paul Müller-Kaempff, Camille Pissarro, Pierre Puvis de Chavannes, Pierre-Auguste Renoir, Karl Lorenz Rettich, Heinrich Schlotermann, Alfred Sisley, Franz Skarbina, Paul Vorgang, Julie Wolfthorn, Heinrich Vogeler and Theodor Wedepohl.

- 1904: One large gold medal each was awarded to: Karl Bennewitz von Loefen (The Younger), Erich Eltze, Heinrich Hermanns, Carl Friedrich Kappstein, Hugo Poll, Georg Schöbel, Alfred Schwarz, Erich Schmidt-Kestner and Constantin Starck.

Other exhibiting artists included: Eugen Bracht, Hans Dahl, Elisabeth von Eicken, Alexander Essfeld, Lyonel Feininger, Karl Gussow, Ferdinand von Harrach, Adolf Jahn, Erich Kips, Georg Heinrich Kührner, Franz von Lenbach, Ascan Lutteroth, Paul Müller-Kaempff, Franz Peleschka, Franz Skarbina, Fritz Sturm, Theodor Wedepohl and Willy Werner.

- 1905: One large gold medal each was awarded to: Franz Skarbina and Ferdinand Schmutzer and a small gold medal for each of Moritz Röbbecke, Hermann Schaper, Eduard Beyrer (Son of Josef Beyrer) and Arthur Lewin-Funcke.

Other exhibiting artists included:Ernst Bernardien, Eugen Bracht, Moritz Coschell, Hans Dahl, Elisabeth von Eicken, Ernst Eitner, Karl Gussow, Ferdinand von Harrach, Heinrich Hermanns, Adolf Jahn, Hermann Kauffmann, Fritz Lang, Carl Langhein, Walter Leistikow, Franz von Lenbach, Max Liebermann, Paul Müller-Kaempff, Rudolf Marcuse, Adolph von Menzel, Paul Nauen, Johannes Rudolphi, Heinrich Schlotermann, Fritz Sturm, Paul Vorgang and Willy Werner.

- 1906: One large gold medal each was awarded to: Louis Tuaillon and Franz Schwechten and a small gold medal each for Franz Hoffmann-Fallersleben, Josef Hinterseher, Paul Oesten and Wilhelm Wandschneider.

Other exhibiting artists included: Laura Theresa Alma-Tadema, Mathilde Block, Moritz Coschell, Hans Dahl, Heinrich Giebel, Karl Gussow, Ferdinand von Harrach, Heinrich Hermanns, Rudolf Hermanns, Samuel Hirszenberg, Adolf Jahn, Maria Lübbes, Ascan Lutteroth, Rudolf Marcuse, Paul Müller-Kaempff, Julius Kornbeck, František Kupka, Johannes Rudolphi, Heinrich Schlotermann, Franz Skarbina, Paul Vorgang and Hugo Wolff-Maage.

The retrospective exhibition, which was part of the exhibition, featured among others Werke von Arnold Böcklin, Peter von Cornelius, Hans Dahl, Anselm Feuerbach, Friedrich Geselschap, Karl Gussow, Ferdinand von Harrach, Wilhelm Leibl, Franz von Lenbach, Max Liebermann, Ascan Lutteroth, Hans Makart, Adolph von Menzel, Johann Wilhelm Schirmer, Franz Skarbina, Fritz Sturm and Carl Spitzweg shown.

- 1907: A large gold medal was awarded to: Fritz Burger and a small gold medal each for Fritz Boehle, Karl Hilgers, Julius Paul Junghanns, Josef Pallenberg, Bruno Paul, Martin Schauß, Wilhelm Schmurr, Rudolf Schulte im Hofe, Paul Schulz, Friedrich Stahl and Rudolf Thienhaus.

Other exhibiting artists and artists whose works were retrospectively shown included: Laura Theresa Alma-Tadema, Paul Rudolf Backhaus, Mathilde Block, Arnold Böcklin, Gustave Courbet, Hans Dahl, Anthonis van Dyck, Ernst Eitner, Lilla Pauline Emilie Gäde, Karl Gussow, Ferdinand von Harrach, Heinrich Hermanns, Samuel Hirszenberg, Arthur Illies, Käthe Kollwitz, Fritz Lang, Hugo Lederer, Franz von Lenbach, Maria Lübbes, Ascan Lutteroth, Hans Makart, Rudolf Marcuse, Paul Müller-Kaempff, Paul Nauen, Hermann Nolte, George Romney, John Singer Sargent, Franz Skarbina, Fritz Sturm and Hans Thoma.

- 1908: One large gold medal each was awarded to: Otto Heinrich Engel and Friedrich Kallmorgen and a small gold medal each for Hermann Fenner-Behmer, Wilhelm Hambüchen, Hermann Hosaeus, Wilhelm Kimbel, Hans Looschen, Alfred Scherres and Otto Stichling.

Other exhibiting artists and artists whose works were retrospectively shown included: Laura Theresa Alma-Tadema, Ernst Bernardien, Mathilde Block, Johann Michael Bossard, Moritz Coschell, Hans Dahl, Ernst Eitner, Johanna Luise Groppe, Ferdinand von Harrach, Heinrich Hermanns, Arthur Illies, Erich Kips, Wilhelm Lehmbruck, Wilhelm Leibl, Ascan Lutteroth, Rudolf Marcuse, Adolph von Menzel, Otto Modersohn, Paul Müller-Kaempff, Fritz Overbeck, Paul Paede, Ludwig Schmid-Reutte, Heinrich Schlotermann, Johannes Rudolphi, Franz Skarbina, Hans Thoma, Carl Vinnen, Heinrich Vogeler, Paul Vorgang, Willy Werner and Heinrich Zille.

- 1909: One large gold medal each was awarded to: Ludwig Dettmann and Ludwig Hoffmann and a small gold medal each for Franz Eichhorst, Carl Langhammer and Joseph Wackerle.

Other exhibiting artists and artists whose works were retrospectively shown included: Hans am Ende, Arnold Böcklin, Moritz Coschell, Hans Dahl, Ferdinand von Harrach, Heinrich Hermanns, Erich Kips, Wilhelm Lehmbruck, Rudolf Marcuse, Paul Müller-Kaempff, Johannes Rudolphi, Heinrich Schlotermann, John Singer Sargent, Franz Skarbina, Carl Vinnen, Paul Vorgang, James McNeill Whistler, Heinrich Zille, Ernst Zehle and Oskar Zwintscher.

- 1910: Among others, a gold medal was awarded to August von Brandis.

Other exhibiting artists and artists whose works were retrospectively shown included: Moritz Coschell, Hans Dahl, Fritz Discher, Ferdinand von Harrach, Emmy Lischke, Ascan Lutteroth, Erich Kips, Rudolf Marcuse, Heinrich Schlotermann, Max Stern, Paul Müller-Kaempff, Pierre Puvis de Chavannes, József Rippl-Rónai, Franz Skarbina, Lesser Ury, Carl Vinnen and Paul Vorgang.

- 1911: Among others, August von Brandis and Max Schlichting received a gold medal. Other exhibiting artists included Ernst Barlach, Eugen Bracht, Moritz Coschell, Hans Dahl, Fritz Discher, Ernst Eitner, Max Frey, Heinrich Hermanns, Erich Kips, Ascan Lutteroth, Rudolf Marcuse, Hermann Nolte, Heinrich Schlotermann, Paul Vorgang and Heinrich Zille.
- 1912: Exhibiting artists and artists whose works were shown retrospectively included: Moritz Coschell, Hans Dahl, Hans Dammann, Ferdinand Dorsch, Wilhelm Gallhof, Sophus Hansen, Ferdinand von Harrach, Hermann Hendrich, Heinrich Hermanns, Adolf Hölzel, Adolf Jahn, Carl Larsson, Ascan Lutteroth, Erich Kips, Rudolf Marcuse, Max Schlichting, Heinrich Schlotermann, Joaquín Sorolla, Otto Modersohn, Franz Skarbina, Max Stern, Hans Thoma, Carl Vinnen, Claire Volkhart, Paul Vorgang and Heinrich Zille.
- 1913: Among others, a large gold medal was awarded to: Wilhelm Haverkamp.

Other exhibiting artists and artists whose works were retrospectively shown included: Hans am Ende, Carl Arp, Ernst Bernardien, Mathilde Block, Karl de Bouché, Moritz Coschell, Hans Dahl, Ferdinand Dorsch, Albin Egger-Lienz, Friedrich Geselschap, Karl Gussow, Ferdinand von Harrach, Hermann Hendrich, Heinrich Hermanns, Adolf Hölzel, Theodor Hummel, Adolf Jahn, Erich Kips, Max Klinger, Hugo Lederer, Wilhelm Leibl, Emmy Lischke, Fritz Mackensen, Rudolf Marcuse, Adolph von Menzel, Charles Johann Palmié, Kurt Schwitters, Ludwig Schmid-Reutte, Franz Skarbina, Franz von Stuck, Hans Thoma, Max Unger, Lesser Ury, Carl Vinnen and Paul Vorgang.

- 1914: Willy ter Hell, among others, received three gold medals.

Other exhibiting artists included: Rudolf Bacher, Arnulf de Bouché, Martin Brandenburg, Moritz Coschell, Hans Dahl, Edgar Degas, Ferdinand Dorsch, Ernst Eitner, Max Frey, Hermann Hendrich, Heinrich Hermanns, Theodor Hummel, Adolf Jahn, Fernand Khnopff, Wilhelm Kohlhoff, Louis Legrand, Ascan Lutteroth, Erich Kips, Fritz Mackensen, Rudolf Marcuse, Richard Müller, Fryderyk Pautsch, Odilon Redon, József Rippl-Rónai, Paul Schad-Rossa, Max Schlichting, Heinrich Schlotermann, Max Unger, Paul Vorgang, Julie Wolfthorn and Heinrich Zille.

- 1915: Exhibiting artists included: August von Brandis, Ernst Eitner, Otto Heinrich Engel, Willy ter Hell, Adolf Jahn, Friedrich Kallmorgen, Erich Kips, Christian Landenberger, Aenny Loewenstein, Otto Modersohn, Alfred Mohrbutter, Martin Erich Philipp, Paul Plontke, Leo Putz, Adolf Schlabitz, Theo Schmuz-Baudiß, Raffael Schuster-Woldan, Julie Wolfthorn, Ernst Zehle and Gertrud Zuelzer.
- 1916: Exhibiting artists and artists whose works were shown retrospectively included: Mathilde Block, Edward Cucuel, Hans Dahl, Ferdinand Dorsch, Ernst Eitner, Nikolaus Friedrich, Gerhard Janensch, Franz von Lenbach, Bror Lindh, Emmy Lischke, Ascan Lutteroth, Erich Kips, Rudolf Marcuse, Otto Modersohn, Richard Müller, Paul Plontke, József Rippl-Rónai, Max Schlichting, Heinrich Schlotermann, Carl Vinnen, Paul Vorgang, Ernst Zehle and Gertrud Zuelzer.
- 1917: Exhibiting artists included: Theo von Brockhusen, Lovis Corinth, Erich Heckel, Franz Heckendorf, Heinrich Hermanns, Ulrich Hübner, Willy Jaeckel, Fritz Köhler, Wilhelm Kohlhoff, Bruno Krauskopf, Gertrud von Kunowski, Hugo Lederer, Max Liebermann, Heinrich Eduard Linde-Walther, Oskar Moll, Otto Mueller, Max Pechstein, Paul Plontke, Paul Schad-Rossa, Max Schlichting, Max Stern, Carl Vinnen, Paul Vorgang and Erich Waske.

New acquisitions from the Düsseldorf municipal art collections on display included works by Arnold Böcklin, Anselm Feuerbach, Louis Gurlitt, Max Klinger, Max Liebermann, Hans von Marées, Mihály von Munkácsy, Hermann Nolte, Eduard Schleich der Ältere, Julius Schnorr von Carolsfeld, Moritz von Schwind, Hans Thoma, Wilhelm Trübner and Fritz von Uhde.

- 1918: Exhibiting artists included: Hans Baluschek, Gregor von Bochmann, Martin Brandenburg, Julius Bretz, Erich Büttner, Max Clarenbach, Lovis Corinth, Ludwig Dettmann, August Deusser, Ferdinand Dorsch, Franz Eichhorst, Otto Heinrich Engel, Max Esser, Eduard von Gebhardt (Special exhibition), Theodor Hagen, Emanuel Hegenbarth, Josef Hegenbarth, Heinrich Hermanns, Hans Herrmann, Ulrich Hübner, Walther Illner, Willy Jaeckel, Georg Jahn, Julius Paul Junghanns, Friedrich Kallmorgen, Ernst Ludwig Kirchner, César Klein, Fritz Klimsch, Gertrud von Kunowski, Max Liebermann, Hubert Netzer, Walter Ophey, Heinrich Otto, Max Pechstein, Ernst te Peerdt, Max Rabes, Karl Schmidt-Rottluff, Alfred Sohn-Rethel, Karli Sohn-Rethel, Otto Sohn-Rethel, Willy Spatz, Eugene Spiro, Lesser Ury, Adolf Uzarski and Max Volkhart.

=== Weimar Republic ===
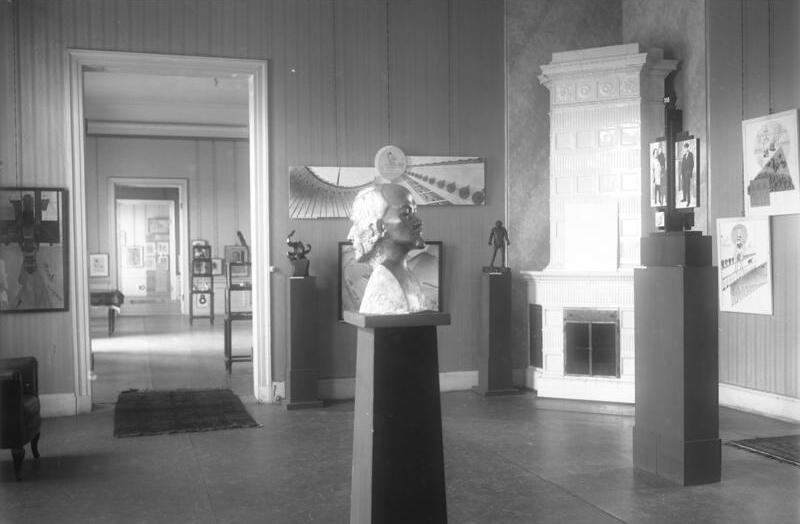
In the foreground, the Room of the Abstracts, Great Berlin Art Exhibition 1931 in Bellevue Palace, German Federal Archives

- 1919: Exhibiting artists included Friedrich Ahlers-Hestermann, Ernst Barlach, Rudolf Belling, Eugen Bracht, Hans Brass, Marc Chagall, Lovis Corinth, Friedrich Peter Drömmer, Otto Freundlich, Fritz Friedrichs, August Gaul, Oskar Gawell, Erich Heckel, Bernhard Hoetger, Karl Hofer, Willy Jaeckel, Leopold von Kalckreuth, Ernst Ludwig Kirchner, Paul Klee, César Klein, Oskar Kokoschka, Georg Kolbe, Otto Lange, Max Liebermann, Hans Looschen, Gerhard Marcks, Georg Alexander Mathéy, Moritz Melzer, Otto Möller, Otto Mueller, Emil Orlik, Max Pechstein, Adolf Schlabitz, Karl Schmidt-Rottluff, Rudolf Schulte im Hofe, Eugene Spiro, Georg Tappert, Wilhelm Trübner, Lesser Ury, Erich Waske, Emil Rudolf Weiß, Julie Wolfthorn and Augusta von Zitzewitz.
- 1920: Exhibiting artists included Otto Antoine, Albert Aereboe, Rudolf Belling, Eugen Bracht, Georges Braque, Hans Hubert Dietzsch, Otto Dix, Max Esser, Fidus, Alfred Gellhorn, Albert Gleizes, Paul Goesch, Hannah Höch, Bernhard Hoetger, Alexej von Jawlensky, Wassily Kandinsky, Erich Kips, César Klein, Karl Kriete, Fernand Léger, Sabine Lepsius, Hans Looschen, Heinz May, Moritz Melzer, Paul Peterich, Christian Rohlfs, Hans Scharoun, Rudolf Schulte im Hofe, Franz Stassen, Fritz Stuckenberg, Georg Tappert, Hans Wacker, Julie Wolfthorn and Ernst Zehle.
- 1921:Exhibiting artists included Friedrich Ahlers-Hestermann, Ernst Barlach, Georg Curt Bauch, Georges Braque, Peter August Böckstiegel, Hermann Busse, Heinrich Campendonk, Marc Chagall, André Derain, Fritz Discher, Otto Dix, Juan Gris, Johannes Hartmann, Ivo Hauptmann, Raoul Hausmann, Werner Heuser, Hannah Höch, Karl Hofer, Wassily Kandinsky, Paul Klee, Max Klinger (Memorial exhibition), Oskar Kokoschka, Erich Kips, Marie Laurencin, Fernand Léger, Max Liebermann, Felix Meseck, Otto Möller, Emil Orlik, Pablo Picasso, Max Pechstein, Paul Plontke, Hans Purrmann, Christian Rohlfs, Maurice de Vlaminck, Max Peiffer Watenphul, Emil Rudolf Weiß, Julie Wolfthorn and Ernst Zehle.
- 1922: Exhibiting artists included Georg Curt Bauch, Hermann Busse, Emma Cotta, Max Ernst, Ernst Gottschalk, Werner Graeff, Hugo Häring, Erich Kips, Fritz Köhler, El Lissitzky, Ludwig Mies van der Rohe, Otto Möller, Ivan Puni, Christian Rohlfs, Heinrich Schlotermann, Georg Scholz, Franz von Stuck, Hans Unger and Paul Vorgang.
- 1923: Exhibiting artists included Otto Altenkirch, Otto Antoine, Hans Baluschek, Willi Baumeister, Franciska Clausen, Moritz Coschell, Walter Dexel, Theo van Doesburg, Max Dungert, Werner Graeff, Gustav Hilbert, Otto Hitzberger, Vilmos Huszár, Alexej von Jawlensky, El Lissitzky, Hans Looschen, Hans Luckhardt and Wassili Luckhardt, Rudolf Marcuse, Ewald Mataré, M. H. Maxy, László Moholy-Nagy, Otto Möller, Peter Laszlo Peri, Ivan Puni, Max Schlichting, Arthur Segal, Ludwig Mies van der Rohe, Julie Wolfthorn, Ernst Zehle.
- 1924: Exhibiting artists included Hans Baluschek, Ernst Barlach, Georg Curt Bauch, Willi Baumeister, Hermann Busse, Lovis Corinth, Heinrich Maria Davringhausen, Lyonel Feininger, Otto Griebel, Walter Gropius, George Grosz, Hugo Häring, Gustav Hilbert, Wassily Kandinsky, Paul Klee, César Klein, Max Köcke-Wichmann, Alfred Kubin, Otto Lange, Melchior Lechter, Max Liebermann, Ewald Mataré, Adolf Meyer, Ludwig Mies van der Rohe, László Moholy-Nagy, Albert Müller, Oskar Schlemmer, Fritz Schumacher, Max Slevogt, Joachim Utech, Christoph Voll und Julie Wolfthorn. Retrospectively shown works were among others: von Lovis Corinth, Friedrich Kallmorgen, Walter Leistikow, Max Liebermann, Hans Looschen, Otto Mueller, Giovanni Battista Piranesi, Karl Friedrich Schinkel, Max Slevogt and Hans Thoma.
- 1925: Exhibiting artists included Georg Curt Bauch, Ferdinand Dorsch, Eduard von Gebhardt (Memorial exhibition), Georg Gelbke, Constantin Gerhardinger, Hugo von Habermann, Hermann Hendrich, Gustav Hilbert, Theodor Hummel, Erich Kips, Rudolf Marcuse, Ewald Mataré, Wilhelm Schnarrenberger, Max Slevogt, Franz von Stuck, Kasia von Szadurska, Paul Vorgang, Erich Waske, Julie Wolfthorn, Gustav Wunderwald and Ernst Zehle.
- 1926: Exhibiting artists included Alexander Archipenko, Hans Arp, Hans Baluschek, Willi Baumeister, Marc Chagall, Robert Delaunay, Sonia Delaunay-Terk, Max Ernst, Albert Gleizes, Juan Gris, Hugo Häring, Emil van Hauth, Jacoba van Heemskerck, Gustav Hilbert, Hannah Höch, Adolf Hölzel, Karl Holtz, Johannes Itten, Béla Kádár, Paul Kälberer, Arthur Kampf, Wassily Kandinsky, Edmund Kesting, Erich Kips, Paul Klee, César Klein, Max Köcke-Wichmann, Käthe Kollwitz, Fernand Léger, Louis Lejeune, Max Liebermann, El Lissitzky, Jean Lurçat, Rudolf Marcuse, Ewald Mataré, Otto Möller, László Moholy-Nagy, Piet Mondrian, Gabriele Münter, Ernest Neuschul, Emil Orlik, Adele Paasch, Otto Rodewald, Karl Schmidt-Rottluff, Lothar Schreyer, Kurt Schwitters, Franz Skarbina, Max Slevogt, Franz von Stuck, Lesser Ury, Erich Waske, Vincent Weber, Julie Wolfthorn, Ottilie Wollmann and Gustav Wunderwald.
- 1927: Exhibiting artists included Lou Albert-Lasard, Rudolf Ausleger, Willi Baumeister, Walter Bondy, Carl Buchheister, Erich Buchholz, Erich Büttner, Erich Feyerabend, George Grosz, Gustav Hilbert, Willy Jaeckel, Hedwig Jaenichen-Woermann, César Klein, Wilhelm Kohlhoff, Käthe Kollwitz (Collective exhibition), Max Liebermann (Collective exhibition), Casimir Malevich (Special exhibition), Ewald Mataré, Otto Möller, Otto Mueller, Paul Plontke, Heinrich Richter, Lothar Schreyer, Clara Siewert, Maria Slavona, Max Slevogt, Eugene Spiro, Kasia von Szadurska, Lesser Ury, Heinrich Vogeler, Erich Waske, William Wauer, Hedwig Weiß, Julie Wolfthorn and Gert Heinrich Wollheim.
- 1928: Exhibiting artists included Hans Baluschek, Georg Curt Bauch, Peter Behrens, Eduard Gaertner (Special exhibition), Anna Gerresheim, Walter Gropius, Elsa Haensgen-Dingkuhn, Gustav Hilbert, Adolf Hölzel, Arthur Illies, Hedwig Jaenichen-Woermann, Erich Kips, Louis Lejeune, El Lissitzky, Casimir Malevich, Rudolf Marcuse, Ewald Mataré, Ludwig Mies van der Rohe, Otto Möller, Gabriele Münter, Emil Orlik, Doramaria Purschian, Thomas Ring, Otto Rodewald, Kurt Schwitters, Clara Siewert, Erich Waske, Friedrich Wield and Julie Wolfthorn.
- 1929: Exhibiting artists included Hans Baluschek, Olga Boznańska, Gustav Hilbert, Hedwig Jaenichen-Woermann, Louis Lejeune, Ury, Max Liebermann, Rudolf Marcuse, Emil Orlik, Clara Siewert, Erich Waske and Julie Wolfthorn.
- 1930: Exhibiting artists included: Hans Baluschek, Gustav Hilbert, Alexej von Jawlensky, César Klein, Hugo Köcke, Louis Lejeune, Walter Lemcke, Ury, Otto Möller, Emil Orlik, Joachim Ringelnatz, Johannes Friedrich Rogge, Christian Schad, Clara Siewert, Max Slevogt, Erich Waske and Julie Wolfthorn.
- 1931: Exhibiting artists included: Hans Baluschek, Elsa Haensgen-Dingkuhn, Gustav Hilbert, Hannah Höch, Alexej von Jawlensky, César Klein, Louis Lejeune, Walter E. Lemcke, Otto Möller, László Moholy-Nagy, Joachim Ringelnatz, Johannes Friedrich Rogge, Christian Schad, Clara Siewert und Julie Wolfthorn.
- 1932: Exhibiting artists included: August Clüsserath, Leo Grewenig, Doramaria Purschian and Harriet von Rathlef.

=== German Reich 1933 to 1945 ===
- 1933: Exhibiting artists included: Otto Antoine, Hans Baluschek, Sibylle Ascheberg von Bamberg, Carl Blechen, Ernst Böhm, August von Brandis, Erich Büttner, Emil Cauer, Emma Cotta, Erich Feyerabend, Werner Gilles, Emil van Hauth, Ernst Heilemann, Otto Herbig, Karl Hofer, Willy Jaeckel, Ernst Kolbe, Franz Lenk, Hans Licht, Ernst Wilhelm Nay, Hermann Joachim Pagels, Max Pechstein, Harriet von Rathlef, Karl Schmidt-Rottluff, Clara Siewert, Franz Skarbina, Milly Steger, Erich Waske, Emil Rudolf Weiß, Wilhelm Wrage, Gustav Wunderwald and Magnus Zeller.
- 1934: Exhibiting artists included: Adolf Abel, Otto Antoine, Hans Baluschek, Arno Breker, Ernst Böhm, Hans Bohrdt, August von Brandis, Erich Büttner, Ludwig Dettmann, Otto Herbig, Karl Hofer, Willy Jaeckel, Franz Lenk, Erich Kips, Hermann Joachim Pagels, Max Pechstein, Leonhard Sandrock, Christian Schad, Milly Steger, Elisabeth Voigt, Emil Rudolf Weiß, Gustav Wunderwald and Magnus Zeller.
- 1940: Exhibiting artists included: Adolf Abel, Hanna Cauer, Emma Cotta, Ludwig Dettmann, Ulfert Janssen, Fritz Koelle, Ekke Ozlberger, Paul Mathias Padua, Hermann Joachim Pagels, Alfred Roloff, Leonhard Sandrock, Karl Truppe and Milly Steger.
- 1942: Exhibiting artists included:Adolf Abel, Herbert Böttger, Hans Bohrdt, Arno Breker, Hans Adolf Bühler, Max Clarenbach, Hanna Cauer, Ludwig Dettmann, Otto Heinrich Engel, Felix Funk, Karl Gatermann, Walter Hauschild, Wilhelm Hempfing, Arthur Illies, Georg Kolbe, Hanna Nagel, Paul Mathias Padua, Alfred Roloff, Leonore Vespermann and Elisabeth Voigt.

=== Federal Republic of Germany ===
- 1956: Exhibiting artists included: Karl Hartung, Fritz W. Kliem, Fritz Kuhr, Waldemar Rösler (Retrospective), Heinrich Schwarz and A. Paul Weber.
- 1957: A prize was awarded to: Waldemar Otto und einen Förderpreis Karl Hermann Roehricht. Other exhibiting artists included: Andreas Brandt, Karl Hartung, Fritz W. Kliem, Fritz Kuhr, Werner Kunkel, Doramaria Purschian, Heinrich Schwarz and Tom Sommerlatte.
- 1958: Exhibiting artists included:n Fritz W. Kliem, Hans Körnig, Fritz Kuhr, Werner Kunkel, Hans Laabs, Max Lachnit, Otto Möller, Doramaria Purschian, Gertrude Sandmann, Heinrich Schwarz and A. Paul Weber.
- 1959: A Grand Prize was awarded to: Paran G'schrey. Other exhibiting artists included: Jürgen Draeger, Hermann Glöckner, Karl Hartung, Fritz Kuhr, Hans Laabs, Otto Möller, Heinrich Schwarz and Friedrich Schröder Sonnenstern.
- 1960: A Grand Prize was awarded to: Paul Kuhfuss and one prize each were awarded to: Achim Freyer, Matthias Koeppel und Katharina Szelinski-Singer. Other exhibiting artists included: Jürgen Draeger, Werner Kunkel, Kurt Mühlenhaupt, Heinrich Schwarz and A. Paul Weber.
- 1961: A Grand Prize was awarded to: Paul Ohnsorge for his body of work. Other exhibiting artists included: Jürgen Draeger, Eva-Maria Geisler, Heinrich Richter, Emy Roeder, Friedrich Schröder Sonnenstern, Elfriede Stegemeyer, A. Paul Weber und Augusta von Zitzewitz (Gedächtnisschau). Einen Studienpreis erhielt Karl-Heinz Herrfurth.
- 1962: Exhibiting artists included: Jürgen Draeger, Siegfried Kühl and Peter Sorge.
- 1963: Exhibiting artists included: Siegfried Kühl and Peter Sorge.
- 1964: Exhibiting artists included: Peter Benkert, Siegfried Kühl, Hans Laabs, Doramaria Purschian and Peter Sorge.
- 1965: Exhibiting artists included: Jan Bontjes van Beek, Peter Robert Keil, Siegfried Kühl, Heinrich Richter, Eugen Schönebeck and Peter Sorge.
- 1966: Exhibiting artists included: Friedrich Ahlers-Hestermann, Eva-Maria Geisler, Peter Robert Keil, Siegfried Kühl, Gisbert Pupp and Peter Sorge.
- 1967: Exhibiting artists included: Friedrich Ahlers-Hestermann, Karl Hartung, Siegfried Kühl, Peter Sorge and Hermann Waldenburg (Special show).
- 1968: Exhibiting artists included: Fred Bandekow, Siegfried Kühl and Peter Sorge
- 1969: Exhibiting artists included: Siegfried Kühl, Christiane Maether (Special show), Klaus Müller-Klug (Special show), Michael Schwarze (Special show) and Peter Sorge.

== Digitized exhibition catalogues ==
- Exhibition catalogue 1893 (digitized)
- Exhibition catalogue 1894 (digitized), (digitized)
- Exhibition catalogue 1895 (digitized), (digitized)
- Exhibition catalogue 1896 (digitized) (Internationale Kunstausstellung)
- Exhibition catalogue 1897 (digitized), (digitized)
- Exhibition catalogue 1898 (digitized), (digitized), (digitized)
- Exhibition catalogue 1899 (digitized), (digitized)
- Exhibition catalogue 1900 (digitized), (digitized)
- Exhibition catalogue 1901 (digitized), (digitized), (digitized)
- Exhibition catalogue 1902 (digitized)
- Exhibition catalogue 1903 (digitized)
- Exhibition catalogue 1904 (digitized), (digitized)
- Exhibition catalogue 1905 (digitized)
- Exhibition catalogue 1906 (digitized), (digitized)
- Exhibition catalogue 1907 (digitized), (digitized)
- Exhibition catalogue 1908 (digitized)
- Exhibition catalogue 1909 (digitized), (digitized)
- Exhibition catalogue 1910 (digitized)
- Exhibition catalogue 1911 (digitized)
- Exhibition catalogue 1912 (digitized)
- Exhibition catalogue 1913 (digitized)
- Exhibition catalogue 1914 (digitized)
- Exhibition catalogue 1915 (digitized)
- Exhibition catalogue 1916 (digitized)
- Exhibition catalogue 1917 (digitized) (Great Berlin Art Exhibition at the Kunstpalast in Düsseldorf)
- Exhibition catalogue 1918 (digitized) (Great Berlin Art Exhibition at the Kunstpalast in Düsseldorf)
- Exhibition catalogue 1919 (digitized)
- Exhibition catalogue 1920 (digitized)
- Exhibition catalogue 1921 (digitized) (Raoul Hausmann: Führer durch die Abteilung der Novembergruppe (digitized))
- Exhibition catalogue 1922 (digitized)
- Exhibition catalogue 1923 (digitized), (digitized)
- Exhibition catalogue 1924 (digitized)
- Exhibition catalogue 1925 (digitized)
- Exhibition catalogue 1926 (digitized)
- Exhibition catalogue 1927 (digitized)
- Exhibition catalogue 1928 (digitized)
- Exhibition catalogue 1929 (digitized)
- Exhibition catalogue 1930 (digitized)
- Exhibition catalogue 1931 (digitized)
- Exhibition catalogue 1933 (digitized)
- Exhibition catalogue 1934 (digitized), (digitized)
- Exhibition catalogue 1940 (digitized)
- Exhibition catalogue 1942 (digitized)
- Exhibiting 1958 (artist-info.com)
