= Echtler =

Echtler is a surname. Notable people with the surname include:

- Adolf Echtler (1843–1914), German genre painter
- Martin Echtler (born 1969), German ski mountaineer
