= Theodor Wedepohl =

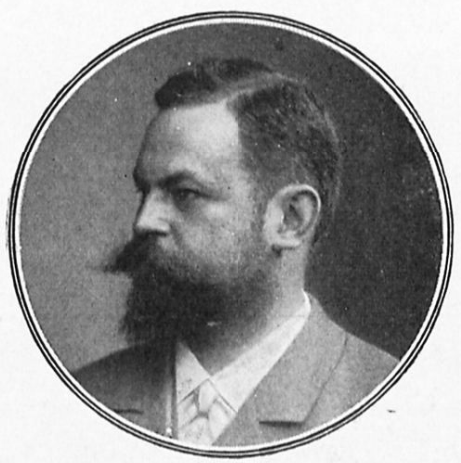
Theodor Wedepohl; photograph by Julius Cornelius Schaarwächter (c.1903)

Theodor Wedepohl (12 April 1863 – 28 March 1931) was a German portrait, landscape and genre painter.

== Life and work ==
He was born in Exter, Kingdom of Prussia, and spent his youth in Westphalia and in Magdeburg. He was originally self-taught, and started showing his paintings in 1878, when he was only fifteen.

As soon as he was old enough, in 1882, he began his formal studies at the Royal Academy of Arts in Berlin. After 1887, he held his first official exhibitions at the academy, and other art venues in Berlin. From 1893, he was a regular participant at the Große Berliner Kunstausstellung. He joined the Verein Berliner Künstler in 1888.

He returned to Magdeburg in 1892, where he became a member of the St. Lukas-Künstlervereins. He was married to Katharine née Siegmund. Their son, Edgar Wedepohl, became an architect and university professor. In 1897, he and his family left Magdeburg; moving frequently. From 1900 to 1901, they lived in Rome, then spent the years 1904 to 1906 in Essen and Dortmund. After 1906, they divided their time between Leipzig and Berlin, where he had been appointed a professor at the academy.

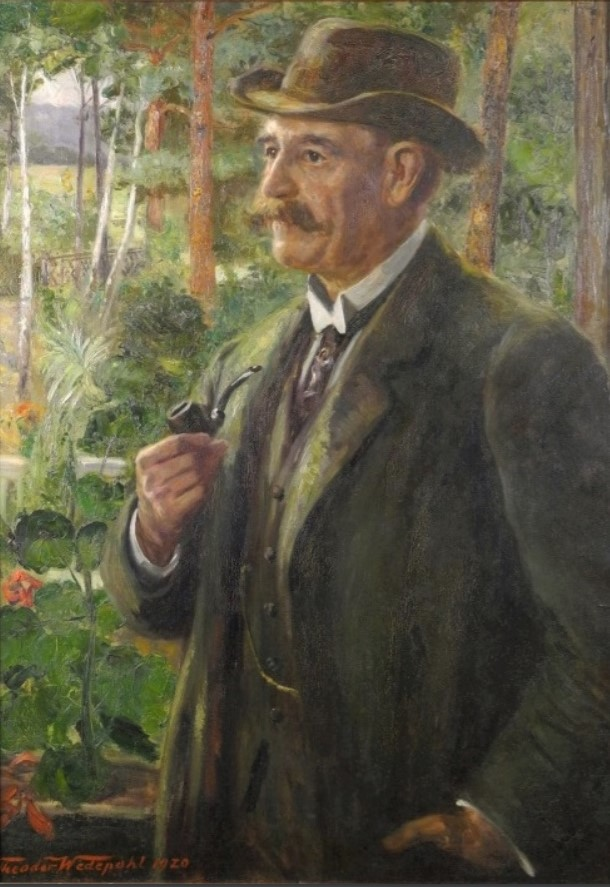
Portrait of the composer, Xaver Scharwenka

He made an extended visit to Iceland in 1910, to paint landscapes. Sometime around 1919, after his son had left home, he bought a house with a studio in Bad Saarow, southeast of Berlin. He and Katharine lived there until 1926. Following her death, he emigrated to the United States and settled in New York City, where he died five years later. His body was returned to Germany and interred at Stahnsdorf South-Western Cemetery, near Berlin.
