= Carl Blos =

German painter (1860–1941)

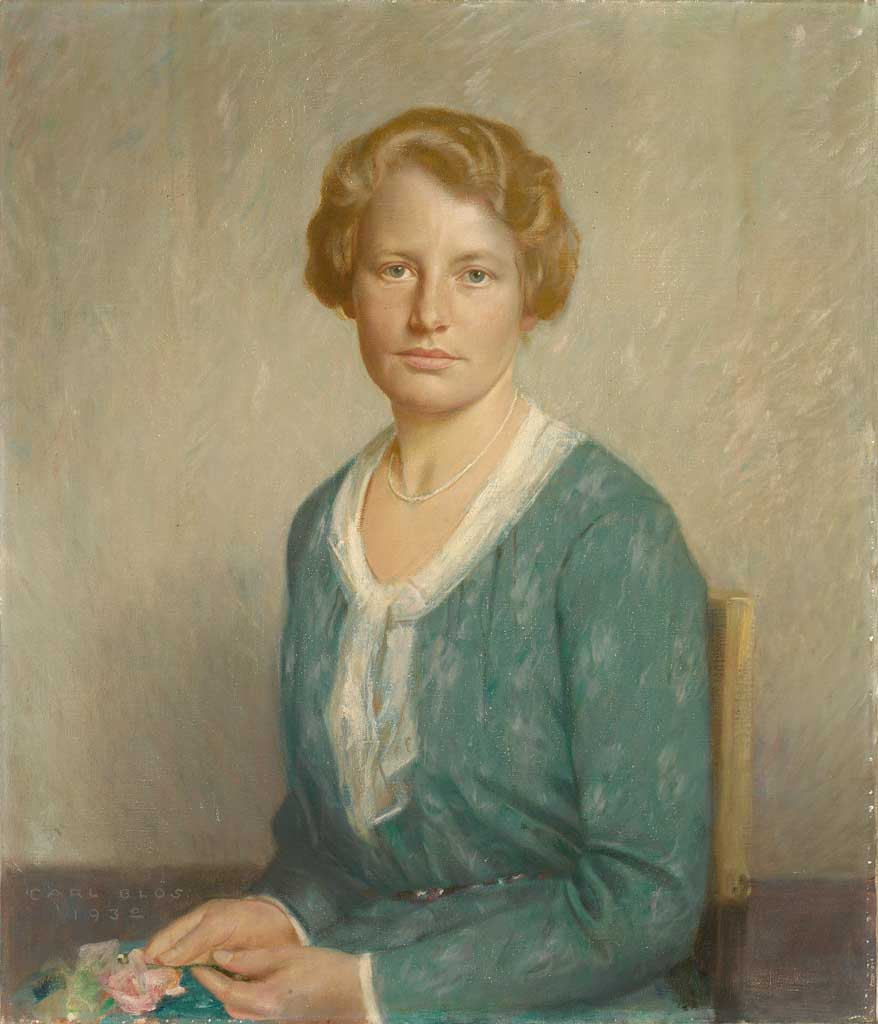
Portrait of a Young Woman

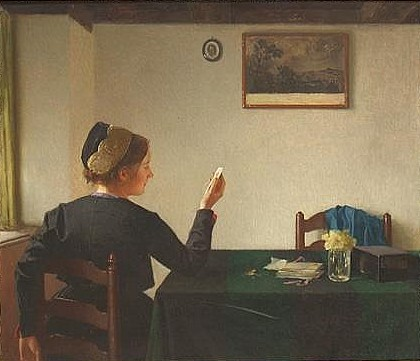
Interior with a Young Woman in Traditional Costume, at a Table

Carl Blos (24 November 1860 – 19 November 1941) was a German portrait, landscape and genre painter.

== Life and work ==
Blos was born in Mannheim. He began his art lessons from 1878 to 1880, at the Kunstgewerbeschule (arts and crafts school) in Karlsruhe. From 1881 to 1883, he continued his studies at the Academy of Fine Arts there, under the direction of Karl Hoff. By 1887, he had completed his studies at the Academy of Fine Arts, Munich, where his primary instructor was Wilhelm Lindenschmit. During his last two years there, he was also employed in Lindenschmit's workshop.

Blos was awarded the academy's medal in 1884, and received a small gold medal at the Große Berliner Kunstausstellung of 1896.

Later, he became a member of the moderately progressive Luitpold-Gruppe. In 1902, he was named a professor at his alma mater, the Munich Academy.

He was awarded the Großen Medaille in 1905, and the Lenbach Prize of the city of Munich in 1937. Several works of his were sold at the Große Deutsche Kunstausstellung of 1939, an exhibition meant to highlight art that was approved by the Nazi Party. Blos died in Munich in 1941.

== Sources ==
- Ludwig Tavernier, "Blos, Carl", In: Allgemeines Lexikon der Bildenden Künstler von der Antike bis zur Gegenwart, Vol. 4: Bida–Brevoort, Wilhelm Engelmann, Leipzig 1910 (Online)
- "Carl Blos", In: Hans Vollmer (Ed.): Allgemeines Lexikon der bildenden Künstler des XX. Jahrhunderts. Vol.1: A–D., E. A. Seemann, Leipzig 1953, pg.236
- "Blos, Carl" In: Allgemeines Künstlerlexikon. Die Bildenden Künstler aller Zeiten und Völker, Vol.11, Saur, 1995, pg.604 ISBN 3-598-22751-5
- Horst Ludwig: "Blos, Carl". In: Horst Ludwig (Ed.): Münchner Maler im 19. Jahrhundert. Vol.1, Verlag F. Bruckmann, München 1981, pg.102 ISBN 978-3-8307-0111-8
