= Hermann Hirsch =

German painter

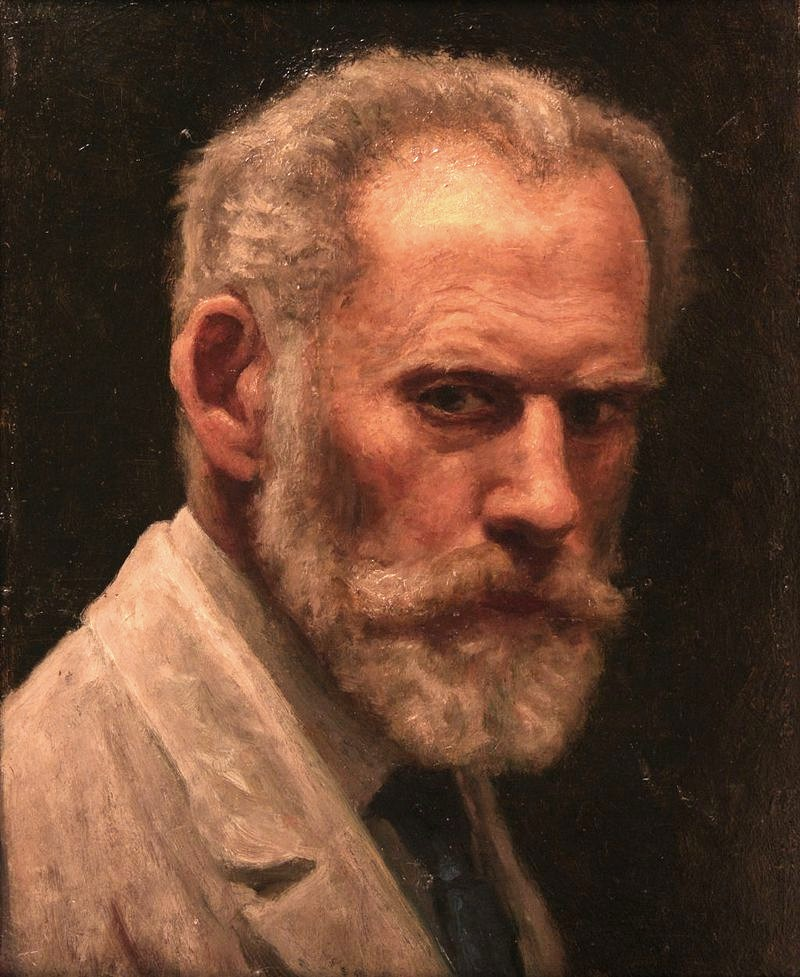
Self-portrait (1920s)

Hermann Hirsch (4 June 1861, Mönchengladbach - 1 March 1934, Göttingen) was a German painter and sculptor, of Jewish ancestry.

== Life and work ==
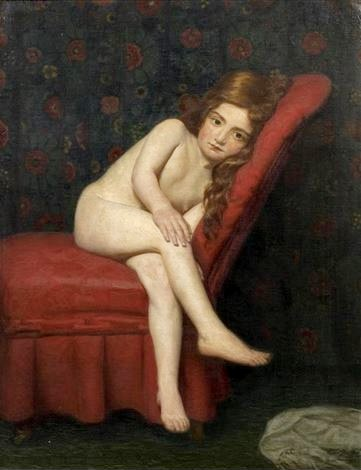
Litrle Girl, Resting on a Red Armchair

He was the seventh child of a middle-class Jewish family. Until 1874, he attended the gymnasium in Cologne, then began an apprenticeship in Düsseldorf with Richard Brend'amour, a wood sculptor and engraver, who owned the "Xylographische Anstalt Brend’amour", one of the most respected printing companies in Germany.

From 1881 to 1885, he was a student at the Prussian Academy of Arts in Berlin. During that time, he obtained a membership in the Verein Berliner Künstler (Berlin Artists' Association), which he maintained until 1914. He attended the Kunstakademie Düsseldorf for one semester in 1886. His primary instructors there were Julius Roeting and Eduard von Gebhardt. He was forced to leave before completing his studies, due to "lack of resources". In the 1890s, he was able to make several study trips to Italy.

He was a regular participant in the Große Berliner Kunstausstellung from 1893 to 1914, but his works received little public recognition. During this same period, he provided numerous illustrations for magazines published by his former employer, the Brend’amour company. From 1901 to 1909, he was a member of the Deutscher Künstlerverein in Rome. He also continued to travel widely; visiting Switzerland, Greece and Capri.

In 1918, he moved to Bremke; a small village in the vicinity of Göttingen. He was a regular participant in exhibitions held by the local Vereinigung Göttinger Kunstfreunde, throughout the 1920s. Painting portraits of the academics at the University of Göttingen (including the future Nobel Prize winner, Max Born) firmly established his reputation.

He moved into Göttingen in 1933, to escape the growing Anti-Semitism in Bremke. There, he was able to find some sense of anonymity, although it had been a center for the National Socialist party for over a decade. Only a month before his move, there had been riots against Jewish businesses. He survived in that hostile atmosphere for ten months before committing suicide, at the age of seventy-three. The liberal Göttinger Zeitung ran an obituary, saying that he was "broken by the hardship of fate" (an der Härte des Schicksals zerbrochen)

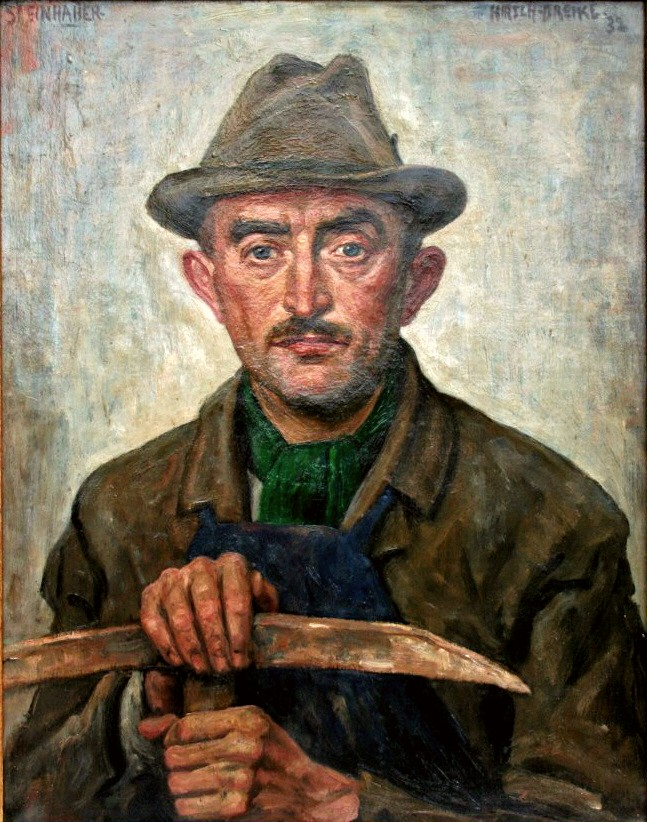
Portrait of a Quarryman

The only public collection of his works is held by the Städtisches Museum Göttingen. One work may be seen in the Foundation Museum at Moyland Castle. The majority of his works are still privately owned. Only a few are in Germany. Most are held by his relatives, who have emigrated to England, South Africa, and the United States.
