= Otto Antoine =

German cityscape painter and commercial artist

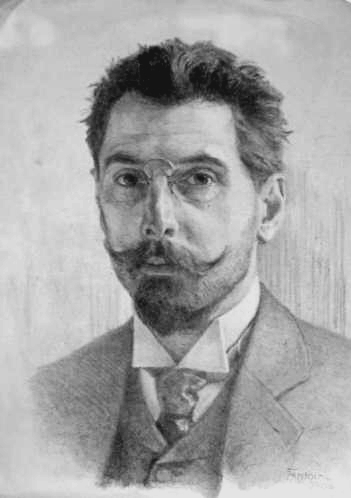
Self-portrait (1906)

Otto Antoine (22 October 1865 – 14 July 1951) was a German cityscape painter and commercial artist, in the Impressionistic style.

== The Painter of Berlin ==
For almost half a century, Otto Antoine was considered an important representative of cultural Berlin. In countless descriptions, he documented Berlin from the 19th century to the first half of the 20th century - for artist friends, he was "The Painter of Berlin". Otto Antoine gained his fame as a "post painter". The postal authority, in whose service he had been since 1883, recognized the artistic talent of the young official early on and generously supported him.

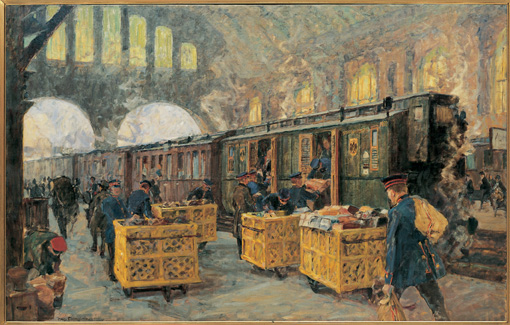
Parcel Post at the Anhalter Bahnhof

He was born in Koblenz to Georg Antoine, a watchmaker, and his wife, Marie née Roesgen. While still very young, he displayed an aptitude for art, and was apprenticed to a local painter after completing his secondary education. Economic circumstances prevented him from pursuing that goal so, at the age of eighteen, he entered the civil service and became a clerk at the post office in the Lützel district of Koblenz. He continued to practice drawing and painting after work, and was often assigned to do calligraphy, due to his elegant handwriting.

When the Secretary of the Post Office, Heinrich von Stephan, became aware of his talent, arrangements were made for him to study in Berlin. He went there in 1891, enrolled at the Prussian Academy of Art, and studied landscape painting. His most influential instructor was Franz Skarbina. While studying, he worked at the Oberpostdirektion, where he painted façades and small murals, depicting post offices.

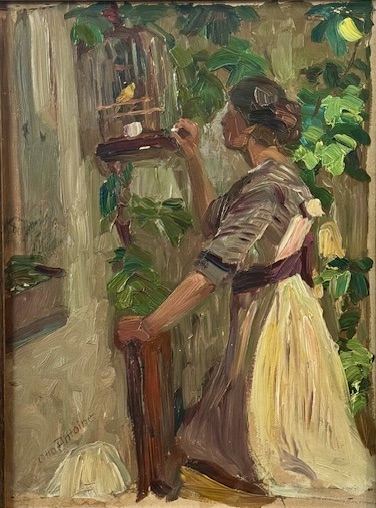
Lady Feeding a Bird

In 1902, he was appointed an assistant at the Postal Museum; selecting, processing and copying images for inclusion. Occasionally, he helped to oversee their postage stamp collection. For many years, he was allowed to use his office as a studio for his own artwork which, by then, consisted almost entirely of Berlin cityscapes. In addition to painting, he was a talented graphic artist; designing New Years cards, invitation cards, advertisements and more. He was also a member of the Verein Berliner Künstler (Artists' Association), and a regular participant in the Große Berliner Kunstausstellung.

He was promoted several times; culminating in a seat on the Amtsrat (Council of Directors) in 1920. Only four years later, the reorganization following hyperinflation eliminated that position. He retired in 1930. Under pressure from the Nazi government, his style after 1933 became more realistic, as did that of most artists. In 1935, he visited one of his daughters in Chicago, and drew sketches of the city.

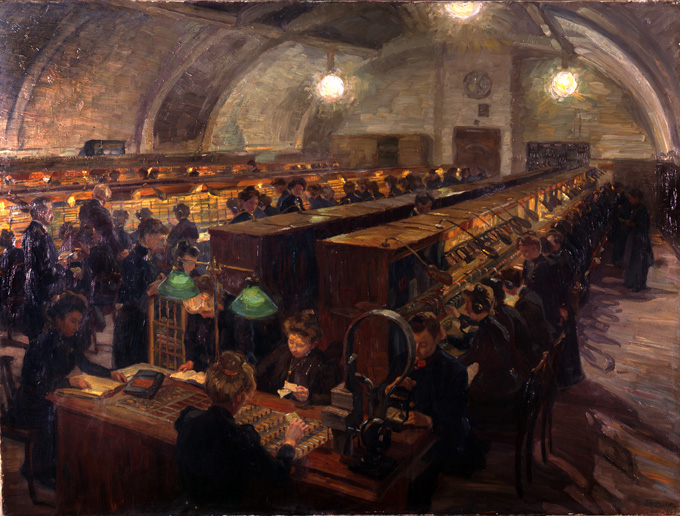
Main Telephone Office, Französische Straße

In 1942, his home and studio, where he had lived for forty years, was bombed, so he and his wife went to live in Silesia. Many of his works were destroyed then, or lost later. In 1944 they settled in Unteruhldingen, a small village on Lake Constance, where he continued to paint, and he died there in 1951, aged eighty-five. His remains were taken to Berlin and interred at the Friedhof Wilmersdorf. Even now, there is no complete list of his surviving works, or where they are located.

Antoine’s grandson, Fred Albright, described the most dangerous time of his grandfather’s life. According to Albright, Antoine resented Hitler’s censorship of “avant-garde” art and forced membership into the state controlled Reich Culture Chamber. Antoine protested by painting Hitler as the devil. Somehow word of the paintings were leaked outside of Antoine’s friend group and he was visited by nazi investigators. Albright said his grandfather denied painting the works, but was “beat up” and some personal art destroyed. After the war, Antoine admitted to Albright that he painted Hitler as the devil.

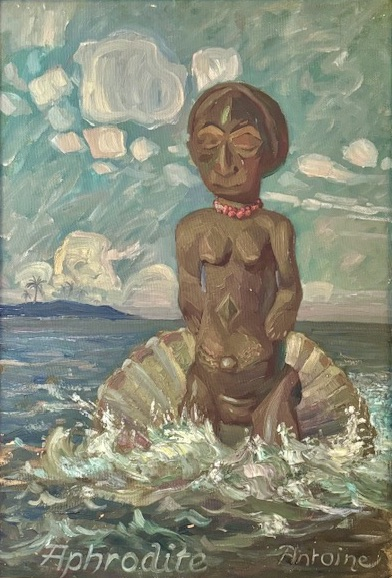
Aphrodite
