= Jules Wengel =

French painter (1865–1934)

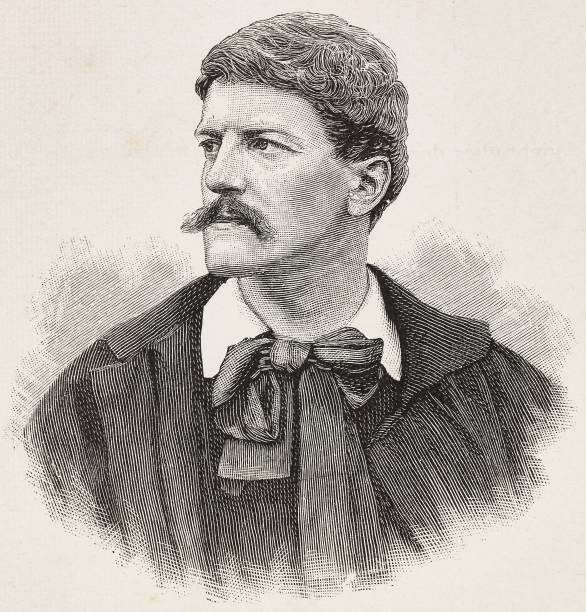
Jules Wengel (1893)

Jules Wengel, born Julius Wilhelm Ludwig Wengel (30 May 1865 – 5 March 1934) was a French painter and illustrator, of German origin. He painted in a variety of genres, including portraits, landscapes and religious works. Many of his paintings are watercolors.

== Biography ==
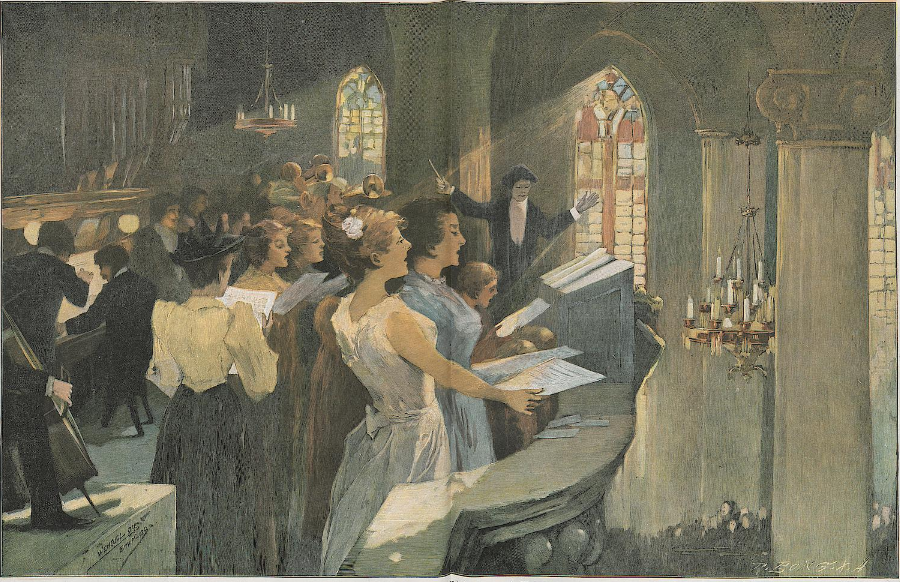
Peace on Earth and Joy to Mankind

He began his studies at the Hochschule für Grafik und Buchkunst Leipzig, then transferred to the Dresden Academy of Fine Arts. Shortly after graduating, in 1891, he went to France, where he settled in Étaples, a small fishing village that was home to an art colony, most of whose members were English-speaking artists, from the United States and Britain. There, he met and married Isabelle Bowes (1864-1937), who was originally from Geelong, Australia. They had three sons, one of whom died as a child.

He exhibited at the Société Nationale des Beaux-Arts from 1892 to 1905, as well as in Germany (Dresden, Munich, Berlin, Hamburg, Leipzig), England, and Austria. He was named an Associate Member of the Société in 1896, when Pierre Puvis de Chavannes was its President.

Around 1900, he began living in Attin, but also owned a home in Paris-Plage (now Le Touquet), where he was a member of the communal committee and published works on the cover of the local newspaper, Le Moniteur de Paris-Plage. In 1905, he became a naturalized French citizen.

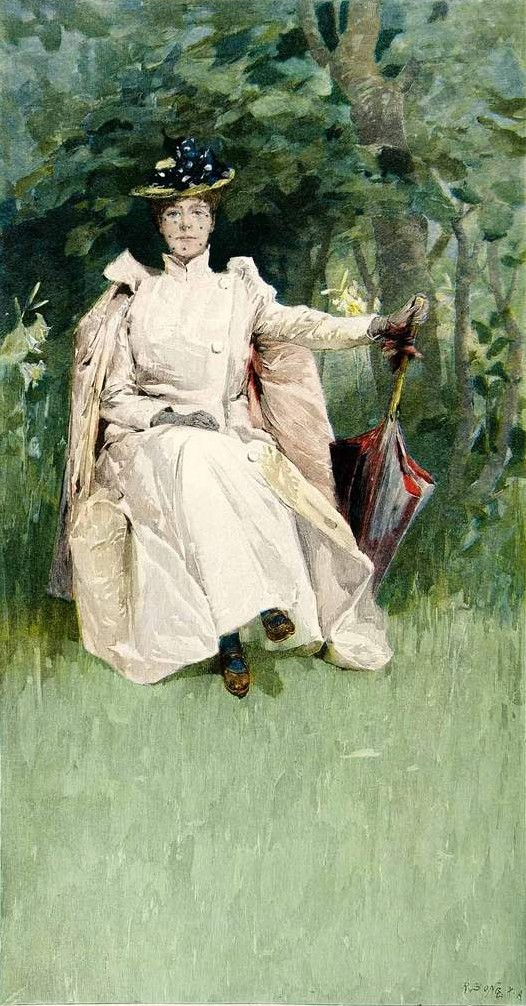
In the Garden

His illustrations featured some elements of symbolism and mysticism; notably those for Taj Mahal, a poem by the Swedish writer Andrea Butenschön (1895), and Goulab Soubi, an Orientalist story by René de Pont-Jest (1896). He also created religious decorations at the original Église Saint-Michel d'Étaples, which was destroyed during World War II. He is, however, best remembered for his portraits, which depict faces and hands in great detail, while the clothing and background décor are merely sketched out in lines.
