= Teutwart Schmitson =

German painter

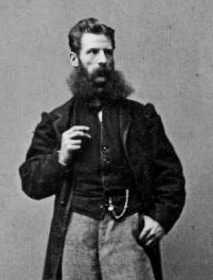
Teutwart Schmitson (c.1860)

Teutwart Schmitson (18 April 1830, Frankfurt am Main - 2 September 1863, Vienna) was a German-Austrian genre and animal painter, in the Realistic style. He specialized in horses and cattle.

== Life and work ==
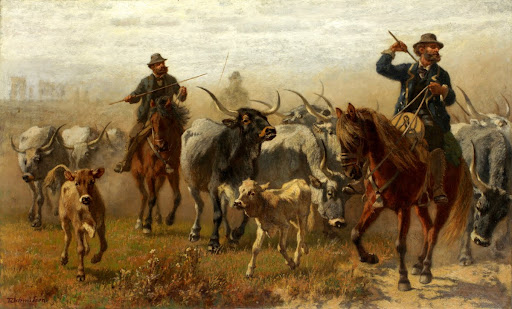
Romagnoli Horse Riders

His father, also named Teutwart Schmitson (1784-1856), was an Oberstleutnant, military writer, and representative of Austria to the German Confederation. His mother was the sister of Protestant theologian, Johann Heinrich Bernhard Dräseke. He was their only son. Until the age of twenty-two, he studied architecture, then he began drawing and painting in oils as a hobby; developing a technique for lowering the oil content of the paint by applying it to plasterboard for a few hours before putting it on the palette. There is no record of his having had formal instruction.

His first public exhibition was in 1854, at the Städelsches Kunstinstitut in Frankfurt, where he displayed a scene of a farmer, plowing. That same year, against his father's wishes, he married Wilhelmine Beckel (1829–1908), from Wiesbaden, and they went to live in Düsseldorf, which was a major center for art at that time. Their daughter, Therese, was born there the following year. The marriage would end in divorce.

In Dusseldorf, he opened a studio and took some students; notably Carl Rudolf Huber. From 1855, he was a member of the progressive artists' association, Malkasten. He also formed a small group with his fellow animal painters, Eugen Krüger and Adolf Schreyer. In 1856, he moved to Karlsruhe, but was there for only a year when he relocated to Berlin.

There, he came under the influence of the animal painters, Otto Weber and Paul Friedrich Meyerheim. In return, Meyerheim was impressed by his methods for representing movement. The critics were not equally impressed, however. and his success was limited. From 1860 to 1861, he took an extended study trip to Italy.

After brief stays in Paris and The Hague, he settled in Vienna, where he lived in seclusion and worked on commissions, many of which were arranged by his friends. He gradually went blind, due to nephritis, which proved to be fatal. An auction of his sizeable estate was held three months after his death.
