= Wilhelm Gallhof =

German painter and sculptor (1878–1918)

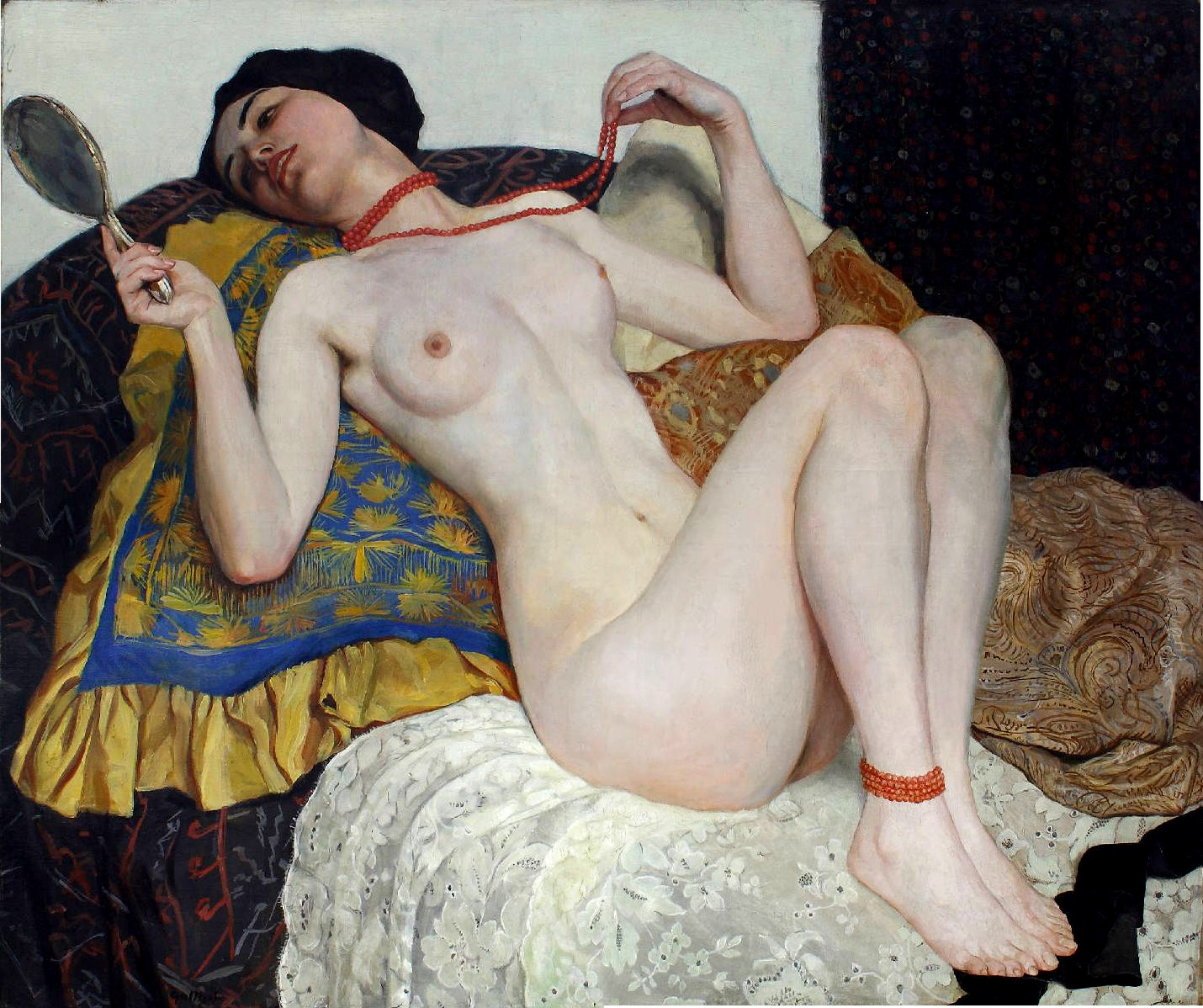
The Coral Necklace (Die Korallenkette)

Wilhelm Gallhof (24 July 1878 in Iserlohn - June 1918) was a German painter and sculptor. At the beginning of the 20th century he was one of the most important German painters of female nudes in the Impressionist and Jugendstil movements.

== Life ==
Little biographical information is known about Gallhof. According to some sources, he studied art with the history painter Johann Caspar Herterich at the Academy of Fine Arts in Munich, then at the Kunstgewerbeschule in Karlsruhe with Ludwig Schmidt-Reutte and finally with the painter Lovis Corinth, who belonged to the Berlin Secession, in Berlin. He worked in Weimar and Paris, among other places. Wilhelm Gallhof had a "fast" style of painting and was controversial because of his numerous erotic paintings, which were considered pornographic at the time, but was accepted and highly valued in art circles. His motifs fit into the zeitgeist of the upheaval before the First World War and anticipated the lifestyle of the golden twenties. Gallhof died as a soldier at the end of World War I, around the age of 40.

Wilhelm Gallhof was a member of Deutscher Künstlerbund.

Gallhof's most famous and frequently cited and copied work is The Coral Necklace (Die Korallenkette) from 1917. The nude shows a fully undressed woman on a chair, looking into a hand mirror, wearing coral necklaces around her neck and ankle. The painting appeared on the cover of the Munich art and literature magazine Jugend in 1917.

== Gallery ==
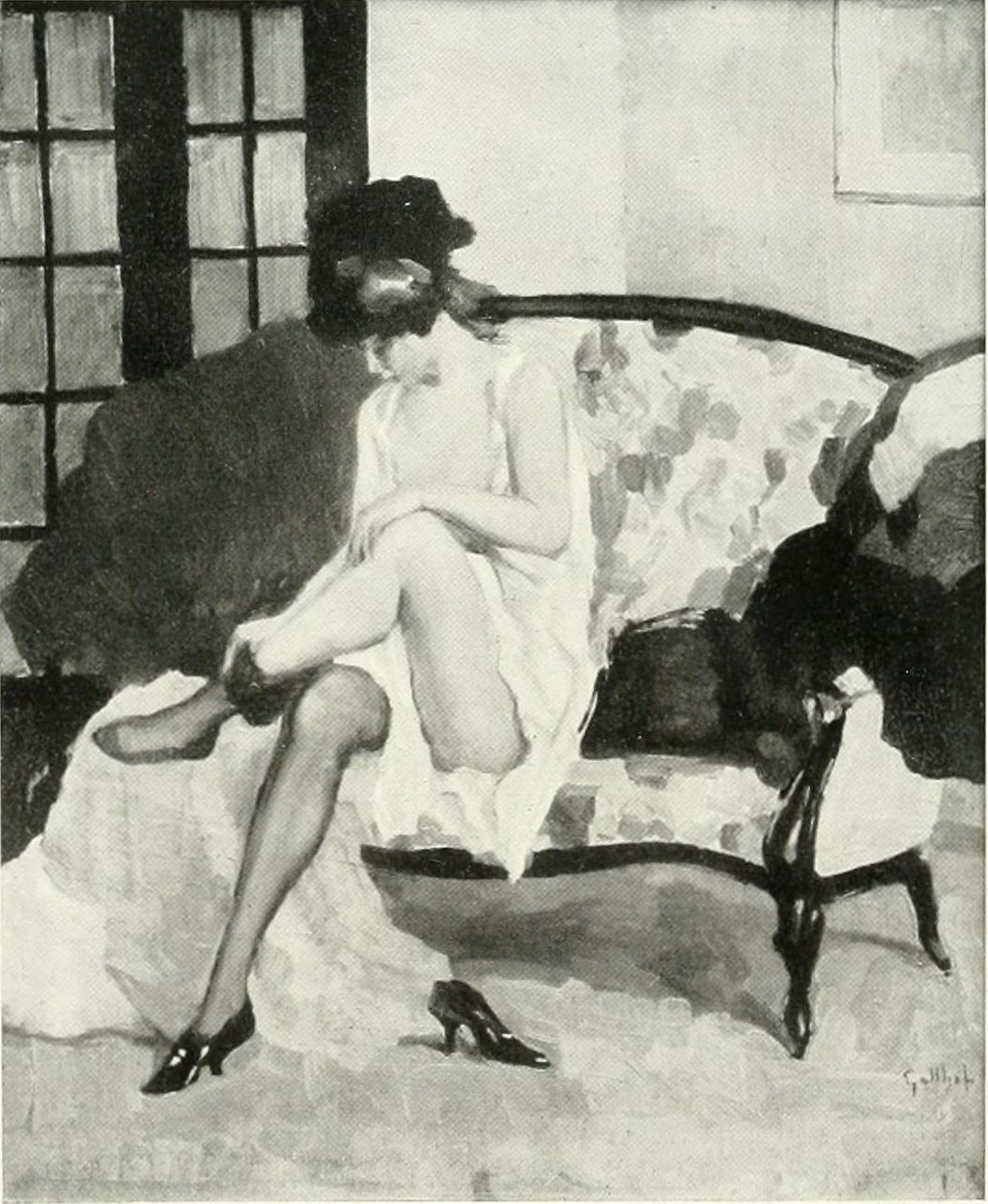
Half Act (Halbakt), before 1898

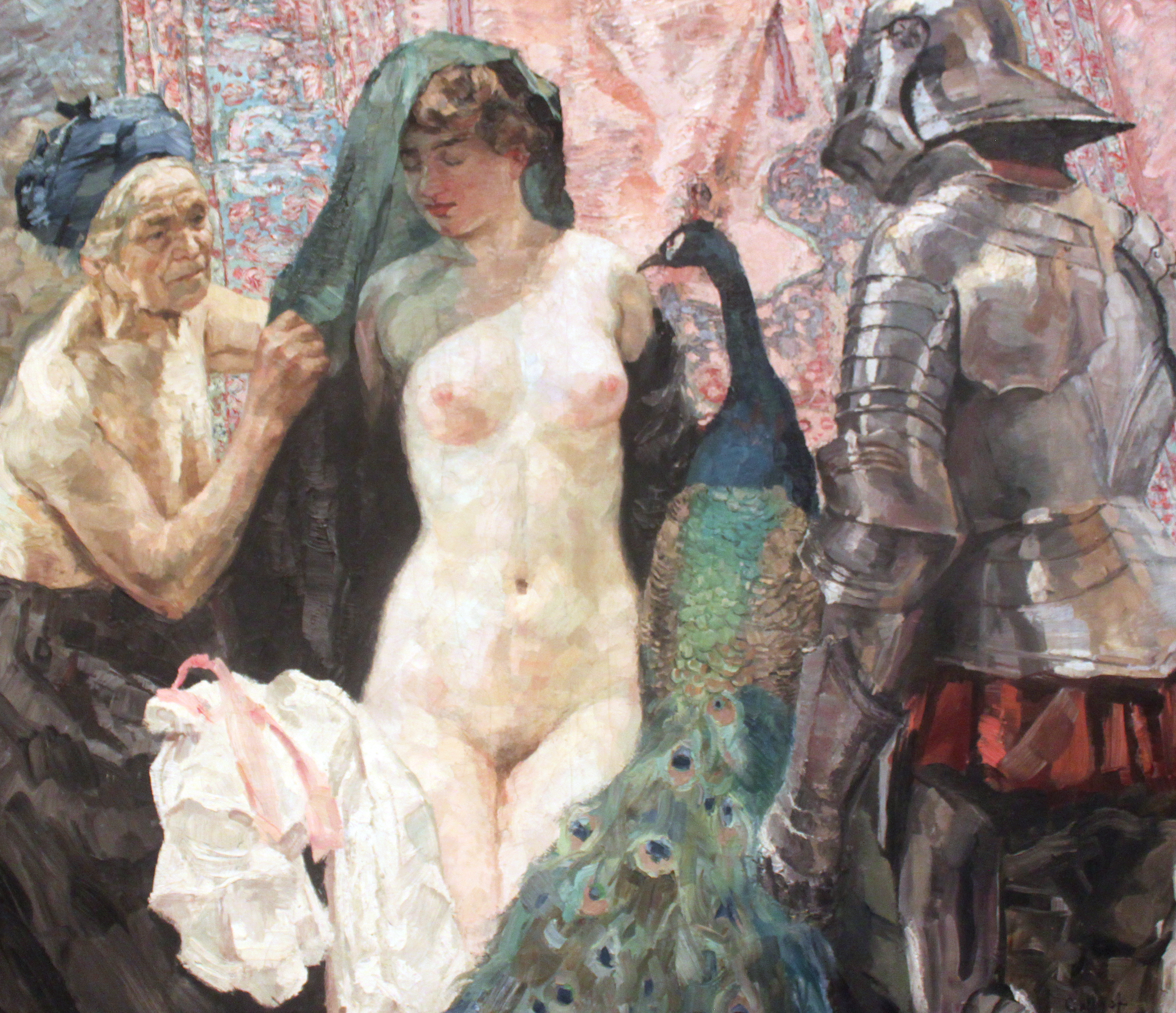
Temptation of the Knight (Die Versuchung des Ritters), 1910

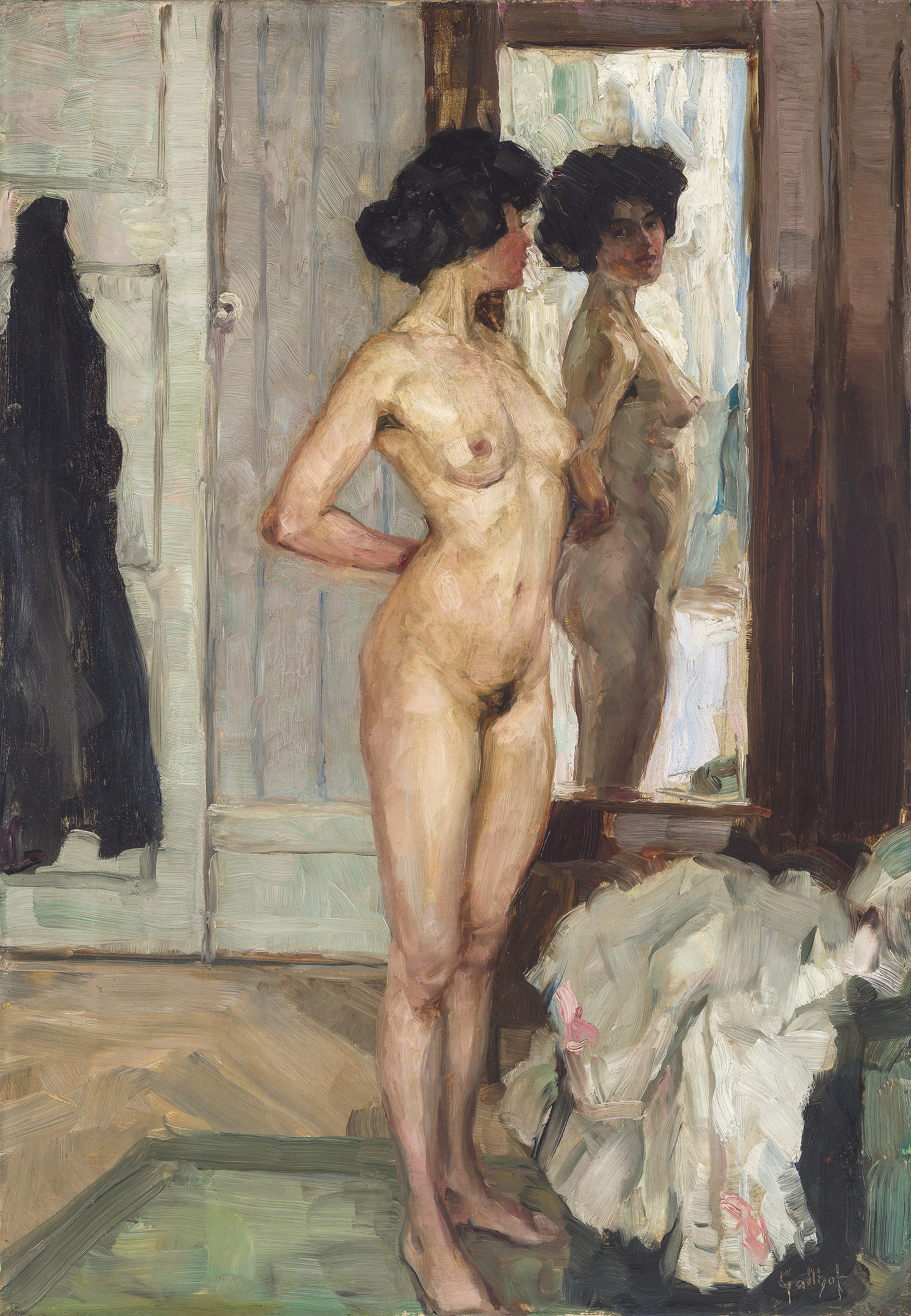
In Front of the Mirror (Vor dem Spiegel) (1910)

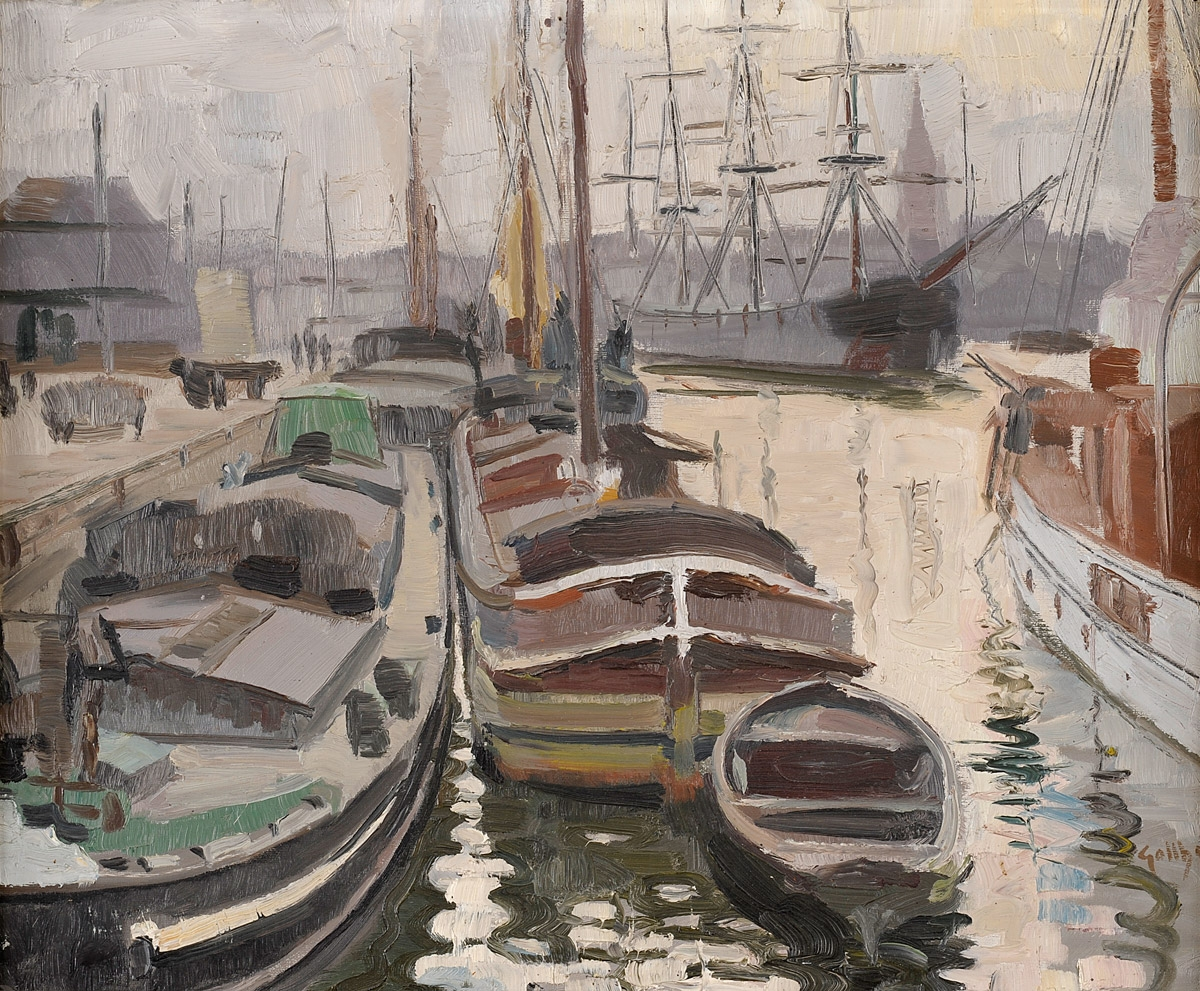
Collier (Kohlenschiff), 1918
