= Friedrich Schröder Sonnenstern =

German artist and painter

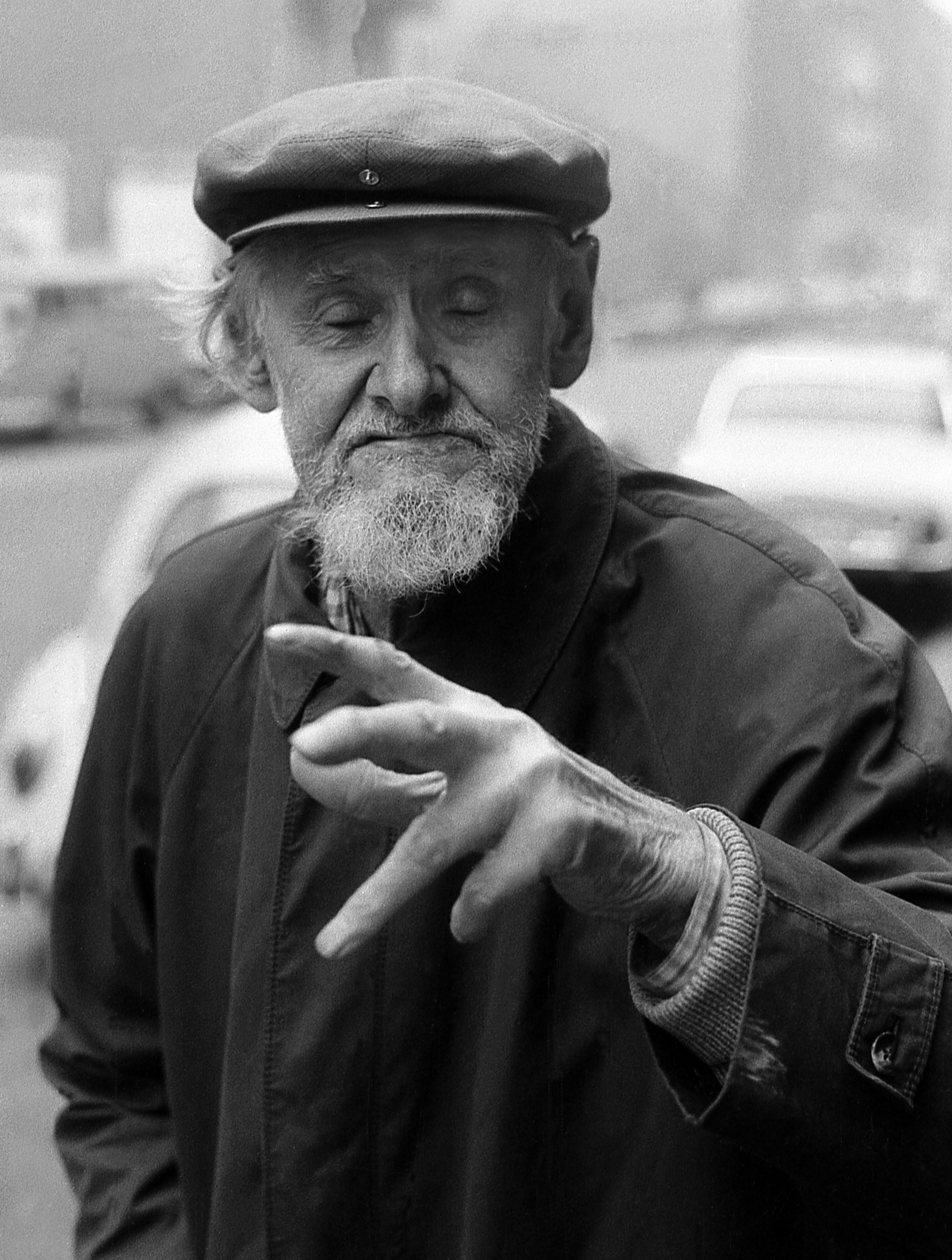
Friedrich Schröder Sonnenstern

Friedrich Schröder Sonnenstern (born Friedrich Schröder; 11 September 1892 – 10 May 1982), was a German artist and painter. He is considered one of the most important representatives of Art Brut or Outsider Art.

== Early life ==
Schröder-Sonnenstern was born in Tilsit, East Prussia (now Kaliningrad Oblast, Russia), one of thirteen children, all of whom apart from one other died shortly after birth. He was sent to a number of reform schools due to accusations of theft and violent behaviour and then to an asylum due to suspected Dementia praecox. His experiences as a child contributed to his lifelong hatred of authority.

He spent time in the army and in a circus before arriving in Berlin in 1919 where he occupied himself with occultism, divination and healing magnetism. He founded a sect and distributed its income in the form of bread rolls to poor children, earning him the title "Schrippenfürst of Schöneberg".

He created the name Sonnenstern (English: Sun Star) for himself while working as a con-artist, posing as a quack doctor in "natural health", calling himself Professor Dr. Eliot Gnass von Sonnenstern.

== Career as an artist ==
In 1933 in Schleswig-Holstein he met the artist Hans Ralf, who first encouraged him to draw, but it was not until 1942, following spells in prison and a labour camp during World War II that his career as an artist really started. At the Surrealist exposition in Paris in 1959, he was celebrated as one of the most impressive artists of the 20th century and was recognised by Jean Dubuffet among others.

His success was short-lived, as he became less prolific and eventually resorted to employing other people to produce his work for him. He became increasingly dependent on alcohol following the death, in 1964, of his long-time companion, Martha Möller whom he called Aunt Martha. The difference between genius and schizophrenia has been highlighted by extensive research on this enigmatic person by professional psychologist Alfred Bader.

In 2013, his art was rediscovered and exhibited at the Venice Biennale. In 2024, the Mönchehaus Museum in Goslar presented a comprehensive exhibition of the artist's work. Some of Schröder-Sonnenstern's works are part of the Zander Collection in Cologne and the collection of the Israel Museum in Jerusalem.

== Style ==
Schröder Sonnenstern's paintings depict erotic and often disturbing figures that are part human and part monster, with distorted body parts such as breasts and genitalia. He used coloured pencil over a thin wash of paint to give depth to his line drawings. Notable works include the demonic Zynus Theory (1953), Vitanovaseturine (1951–52) and several works on the theme of the Fall of man, including Uschastelynore (1951) and The Snake Seduction (1955).

== See also ==
Wikiart page: Friedrich Schroder-Sonnenstern

- Robin Pape, Burkhart Brückner: Biography of Friedrich Emil Schröder Sonnenstern in: Biographical Archive of Psychiatry (BIAPSY).
