= Adolf Echtler =

German painter

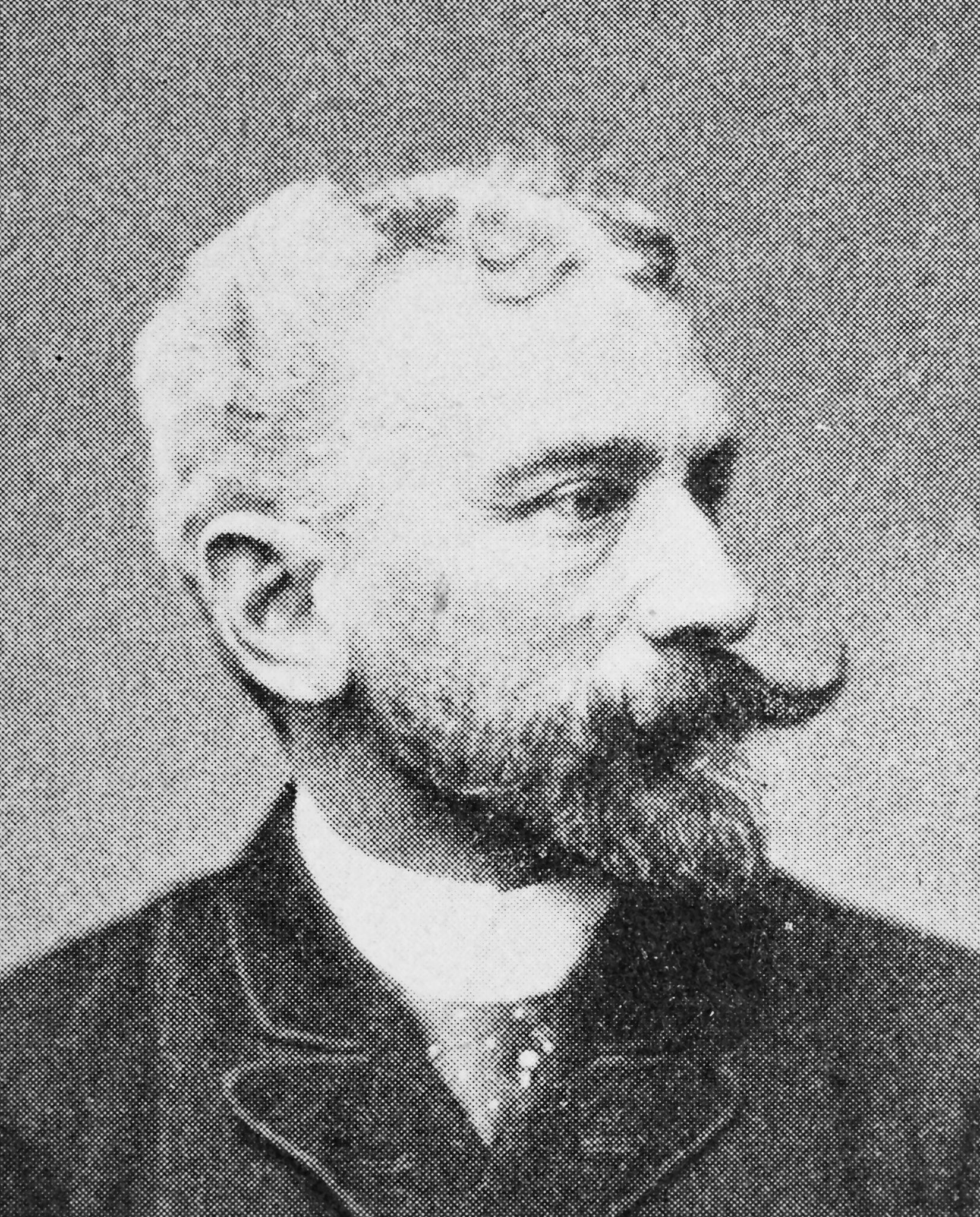
Adolf Echtler (c.1890)

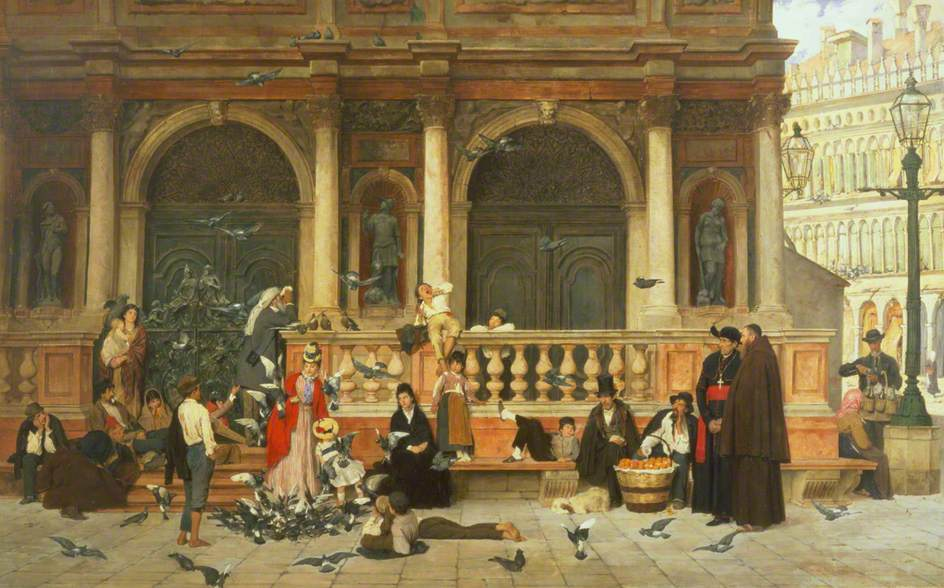
The Piazza San Marco, Venice

Adolf Echtler (5 May 1843 – 23 September 1914) was a German genre painter; noted for his detailed scenes and facial expressions.

== Life and work ==
He was born in Danzig. His father, Eduard Echtler, was a painter and photographer. In 1847, he accompanied his father to Riga, then on to Saint Petersburg in 1850. There, he was given his first painting lessons. For health reasons, he went to Venice around 1860, where he studied at the Accademia di Belle Arti di Venezia. Later, he enrolled at the Academy of Fine Arts, Munich. His primary instructor there was Wilhelm von Diez.

He began exhibiting in 1869; showing his works Munich, Berlin, Düsseldorf, Dresden and Königsberg. In 1870, he became a member of the Vienna Künstlerhaus.

He was married in Aachen in 1876. From the following year to 1886, he and his wife lived in Paris, where he exhibited at the Salon from 1879 to 1885. His son, also named Adolf, was born in 1878. He left Paris after his wife died; returning to Munich with his son.

In 1896, he was awarded a large gold medal at the Große Berliner Kunstausstellung. He would revisit Venice several times. Many of his works were published in Die Gartenlaube.

He was named an Honorary Member of the Munich Academy, and held the title of Royal Professor. Two of his works were purchased by Luitpold, Prince Regent of Bavaria, and some were widely reproduced. He died in 1914 in Munich.

== Sources ==
- Short autobiography, In: Das geistige Deutschland am Ende des 19. Jahrhunderts. Enzyklopädie des deutschen Geisteslebens in biographischen Skizzen. Vol.1: "Die Bildenden Künstler". Leipzig/Berlin 1898
- Willy Burger, "Echtler, Adolf", In: Allgemeines Lexikon der Bildenden Künstler von der Antike bis zur Gegenwart, Vol. 10: Dubolon–Erlwein, E. A. Seemann, Leipzig 1914, pp. 315–316 (Online)
- Horst Ludwig: "Ernst Zimmermann, Alois Erdtelt und Adolf Echtler. Münchner Maler der Gründerzeit. Wilhelm Diez und seine Schule". In: Weltkunst #50, 1980, pp. 1024–1026
- (in German) Susanna Partsch: Echtler, Adolf. In: Allgemeines Künstlerlexikon. Die Bildenden Künstler aller Zeiten und Völker (AKL). Band 32, Saur, München u. a. 2002, ISBN 3-598-22772-8, S. 56
