= Martin Erich Philipp =

German artist

Martin Erich Philipp (1887 in Zwickau – 1978 in Dresden) was an influential German Jewish artist.
