= Herbig =

Herbig is a German surname. Notable people with the surname include:

- George Herbig (1920–2013), American astronomer
- Günther Herbig (born 1931), German conductor
- Michael Herbig (born 1968), German film director and actor
- Nate Herbig (born 1994), American football player
- Nick Herbig (born 2001), American football player
- Wilhelm Herbig (1788–1861), German painter
- Harriet Herbig-Matten (born 2003), German actress
