= Max Rabes =

German painter

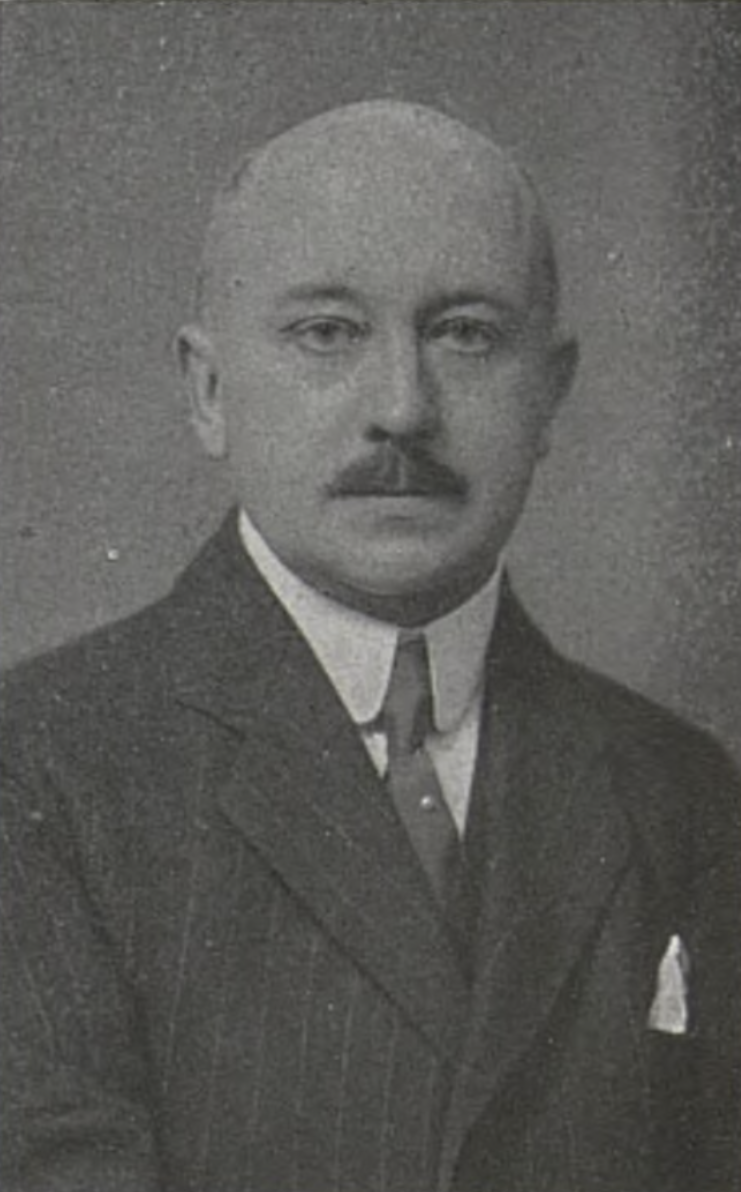
Max Rabes (c. 1916)

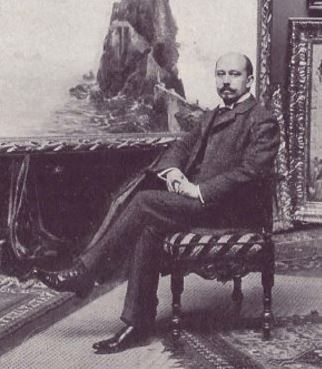
Max Rabes in his studio (1905)

Max Friedrich Ferdinand Rabes (17 April 1868 – 25 July 1944) was a German Impressionist painter. Although he is best remembered as an Orientalist painter, he rejected that label during his lifetime and wanted all of his works to be equally recognized.

== Biography ==
Rabes was born in Szamotuły. Following several moves, his family settled in Berlin in 1876. He was initially self taught by making nature studies and sketches. Later, he took lessons from the landscape painter Paul Graeb (1842–1892). Following Graeb's advice, he entered into an apprenticeship with the decorative painter Paul Borgmann.

He made numerous trips to North Africa and the Middle East. In 1898, on the recommendation of Oswald von Richthofen, the Foreign Secretary, he was invited to accompany Kaiser Wilhelm II on a trip to Istanbul and Palestine. His fellow painters Carl Saltzmann and Ismael Gentz were also part of the entourage. Many years later, he would travel to America with Prince Cyril of Bulgaria.

He was appointed an honorary doctor and became a Professor at the Berlin University of the Arts. In 1899, he was awarded the Order of the Zähringer Lion.

In 1914, he undertook a trip to the front lines in East Prussia. The following year, he was at the western front in Belgium and, in 1917, visited Verdun. In between these trips, he maintained a residence in Berlin-Charlottenburg.

In addition to his canvases, he did decorative work; including landscape murals at a castle in Lausitz (1901) and a villa in Iserlohn (1905), as well as ceiling paintings and allegorical murals at the Schauspielhaus in what is now Wrocław (1906–1908).

He died in 1944 in Vienna.

== Selected paintings ==
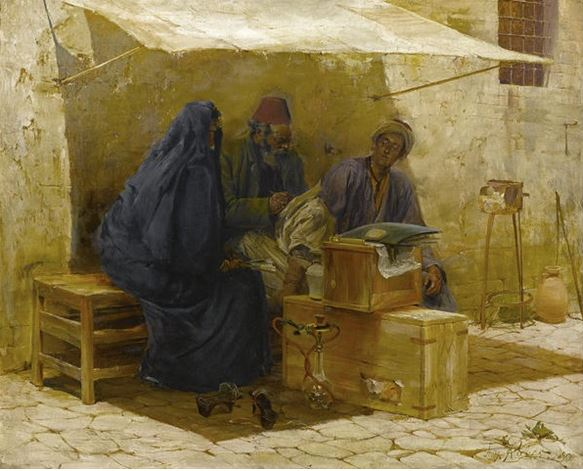
The Scribe

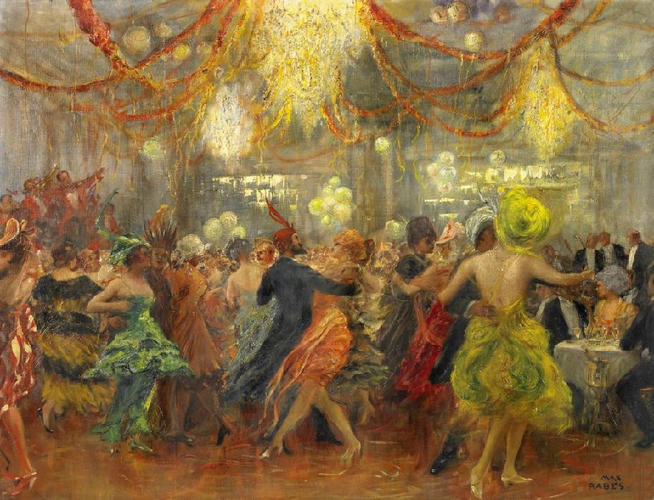
Vienna Masked Ball

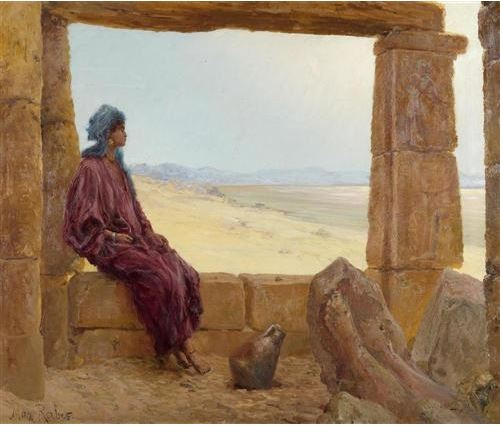
Young Egyptian, Resting

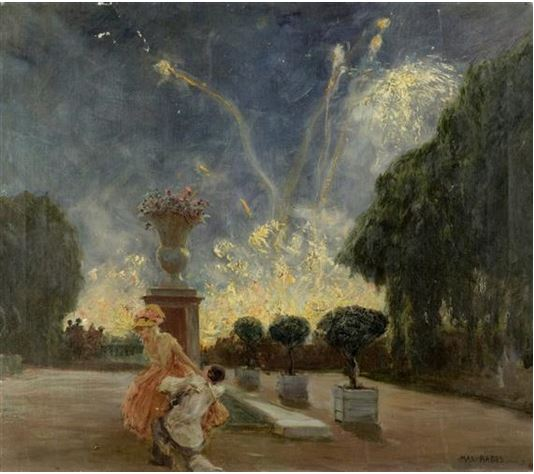
Fireworks at Versailles
