= Hermann Eschke =

German painter

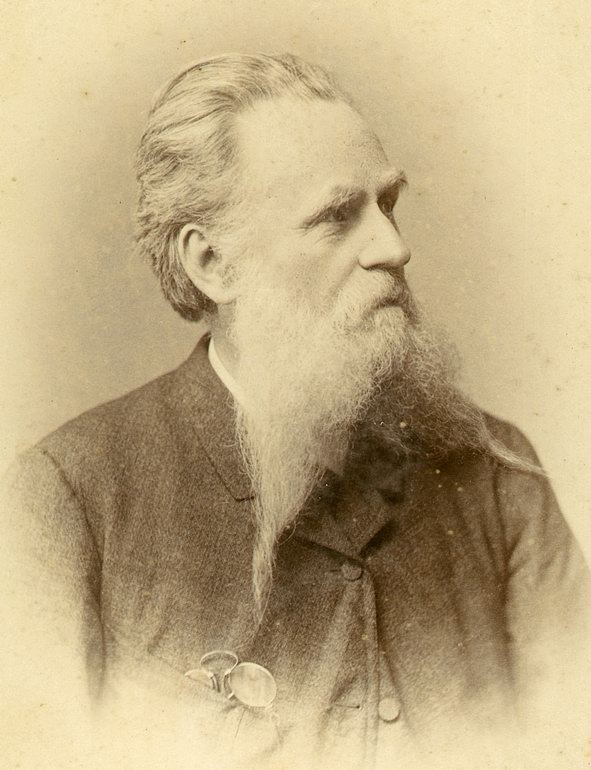
- Portrait (1890s)
- Born: Hermann Wilhelm Benjamin Eschke; 6 May 1823; Berlin, Kingdom of Prussia
- Died: 15 January 1900 (aged 76); Berlin, Kingdom of Prussia, German Empire
- Known for: Painting

Hermann Wilhelm Benjamin Eschke (6 May 1823 - 15 January 1900) was a German painter who specialized in marine art.

== Biography ==
Eschke was born in Berlin. In 1840, at the age of seventeen, he began his studies with Professor Wilhelm Herbig and, upon his recommendation, attended the Prussian Academy of Art from 1841 to 1845. After graduating, he obtained a position in the studios of the marine painter, Wilhelm Krause, where he remained until 1848. Through Krause's recommendation, he obtained a similar position in the studios of Eugène Lepoittevin in Paris.

In 1850, he took extensive study trips through Southern France and the Pyrenees. When he returned to Berlin, he became a freelance artist. Over the next thirty years, he continued to travel frequently; visiting the North Sea, Norway, Wales, the Isle of Wight, Jersey and Brittany, among other places. All of these trips produced numerous sketches that were later turned into oil paintings, although he also did some work en plein aire.

Among his most familiar works are those created together with his son, Richard Eschke, for the "Kaiserpanorama": The German Fleet on Display at Zanzibar, and The Seizure of New Guinea. Eschke was later given the title "Königlicher Professor" and received a gold medal at an exhibition by the "Verein Berliner Künstler" (Association of Berlin Artists).

He was also well known as a teacher. His students included Louis Douzette, Ernst Koerner, Walter Moras, Carl Saltzmann, Alexander Kircher and Elisabeth Reuter. Altogether, he and his wife Anna had ten children, of whom two, Richard and Oscar, became painters. He died in Berlin.

== Selected paintings ==
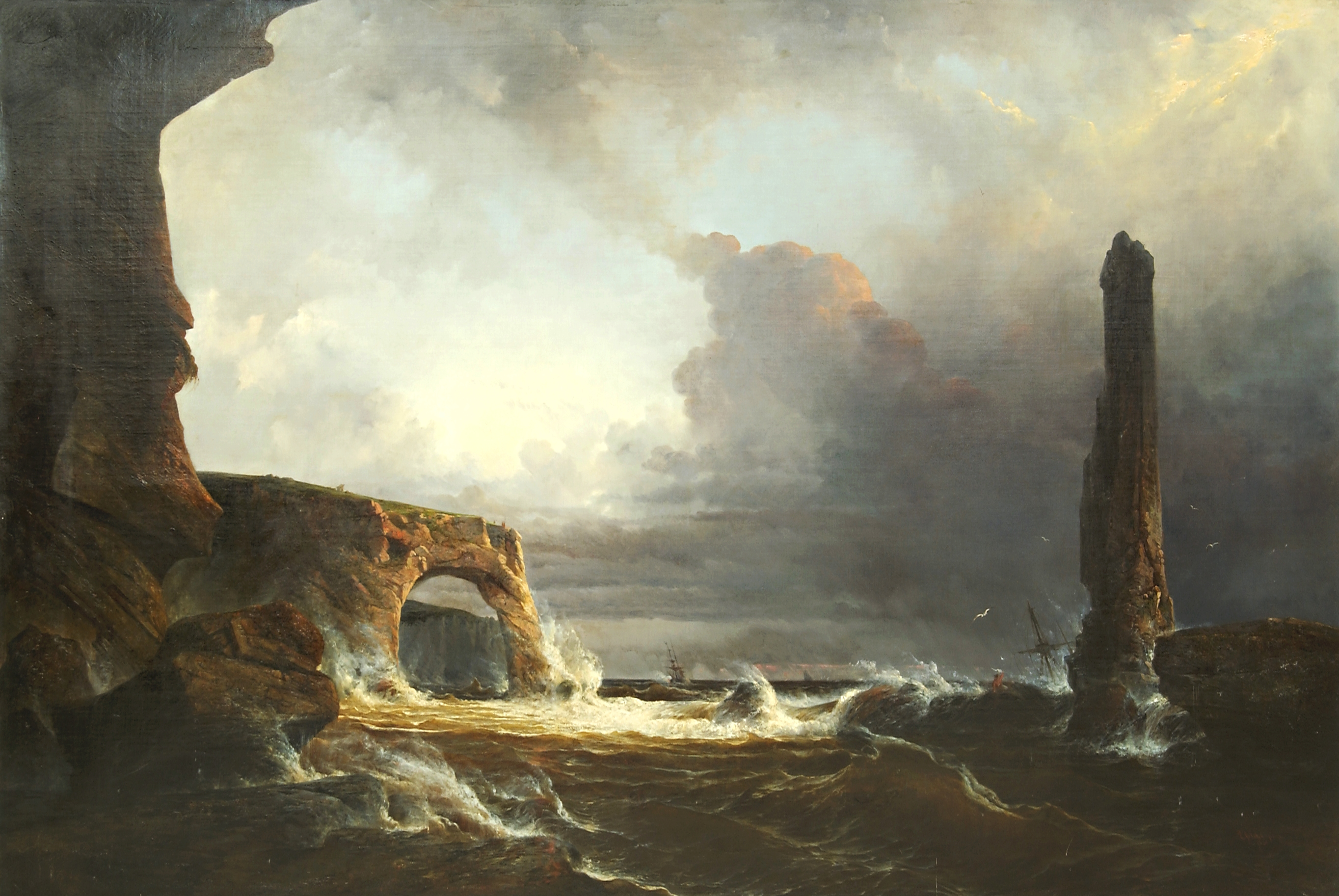
The Coming Storm

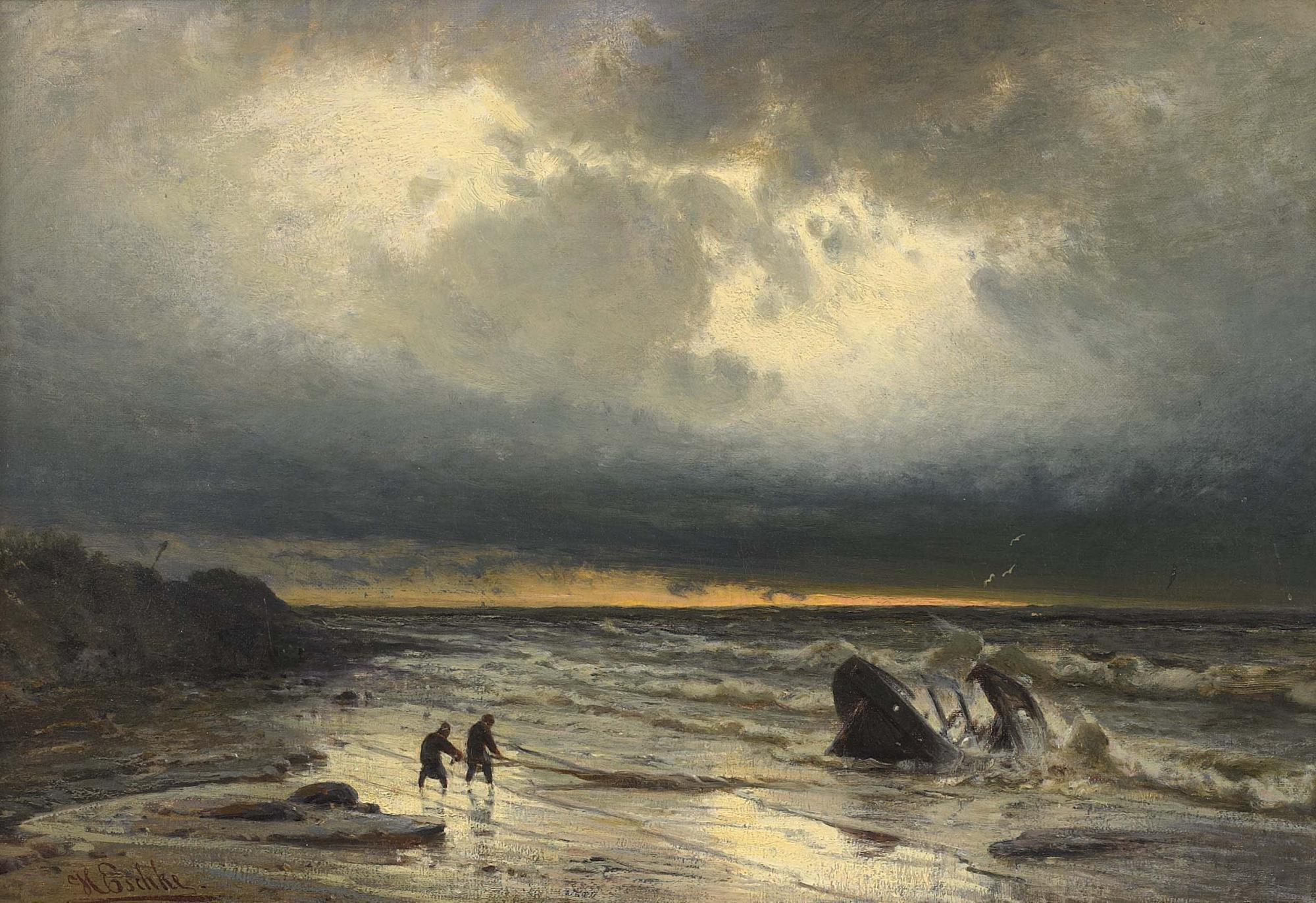
Shipwreck

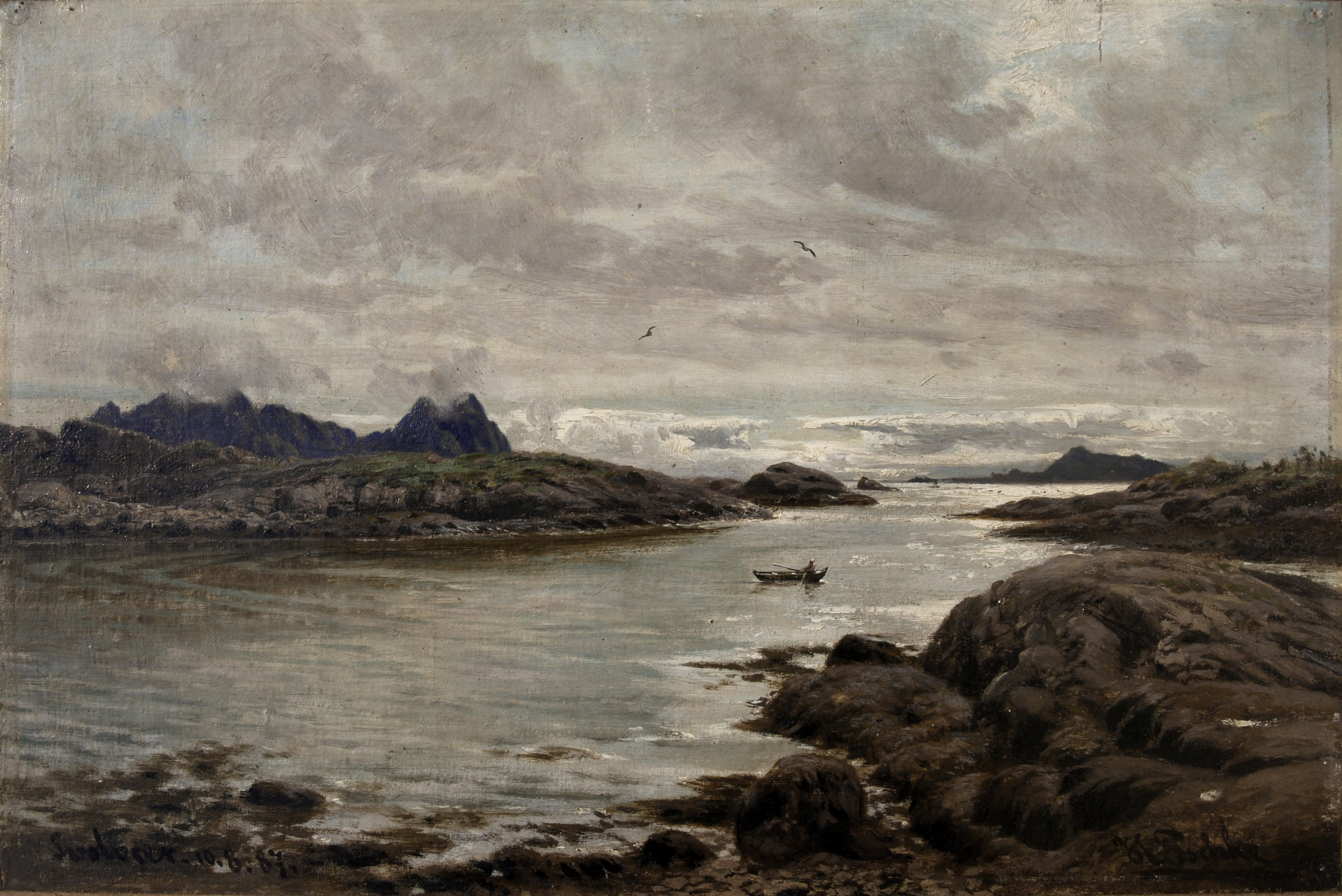
View of Svolvaer

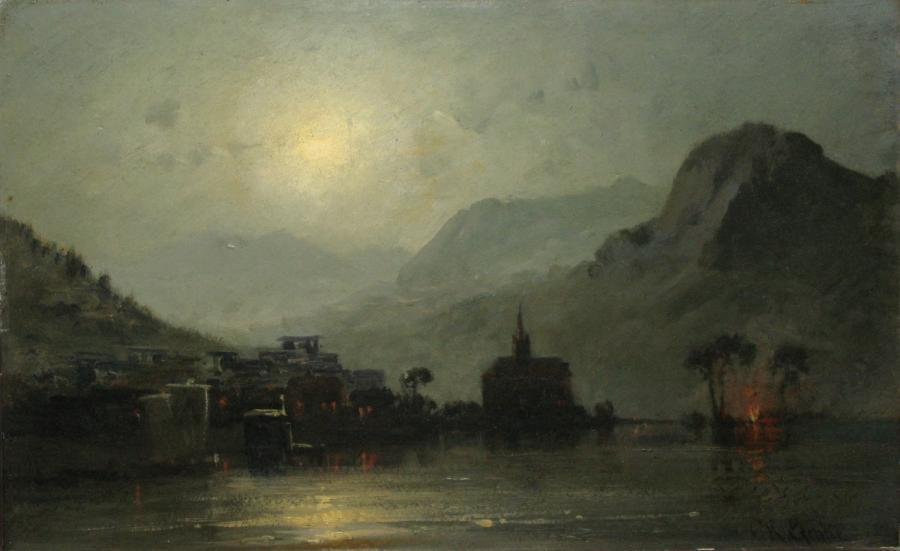
Lake Geneva in the Moonlight

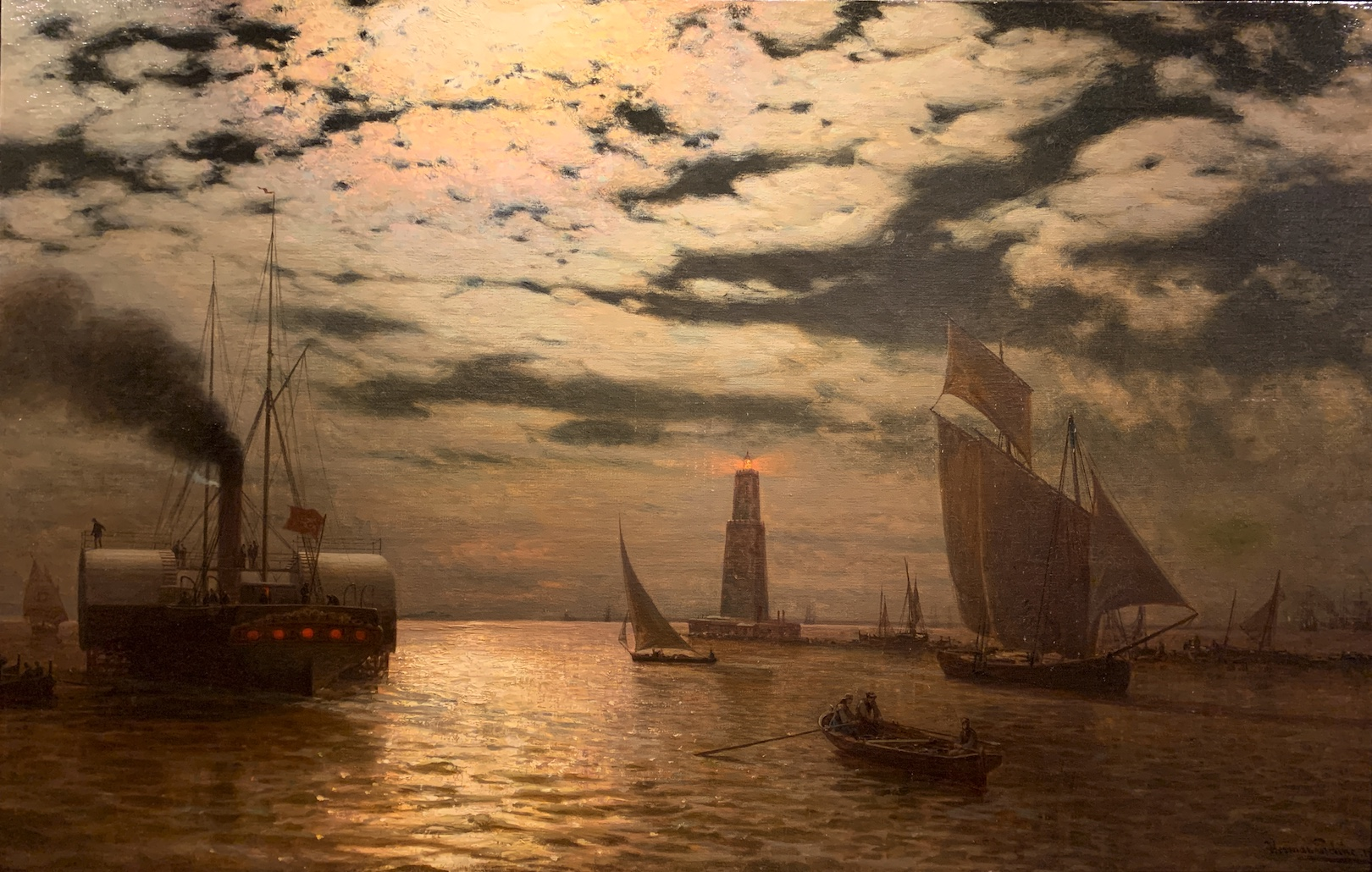
