= Ernst Koerner =

German painter (1846–1927)

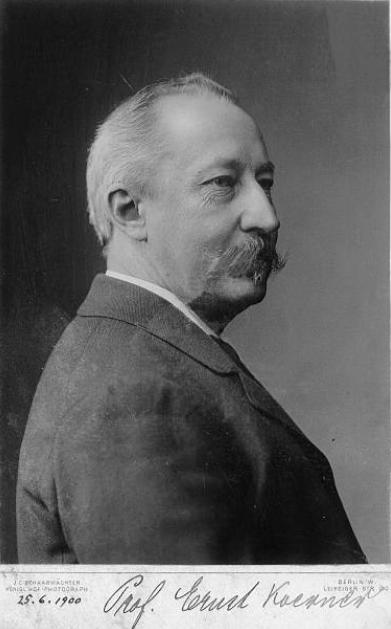
Ernst Koerner (c. 1900)

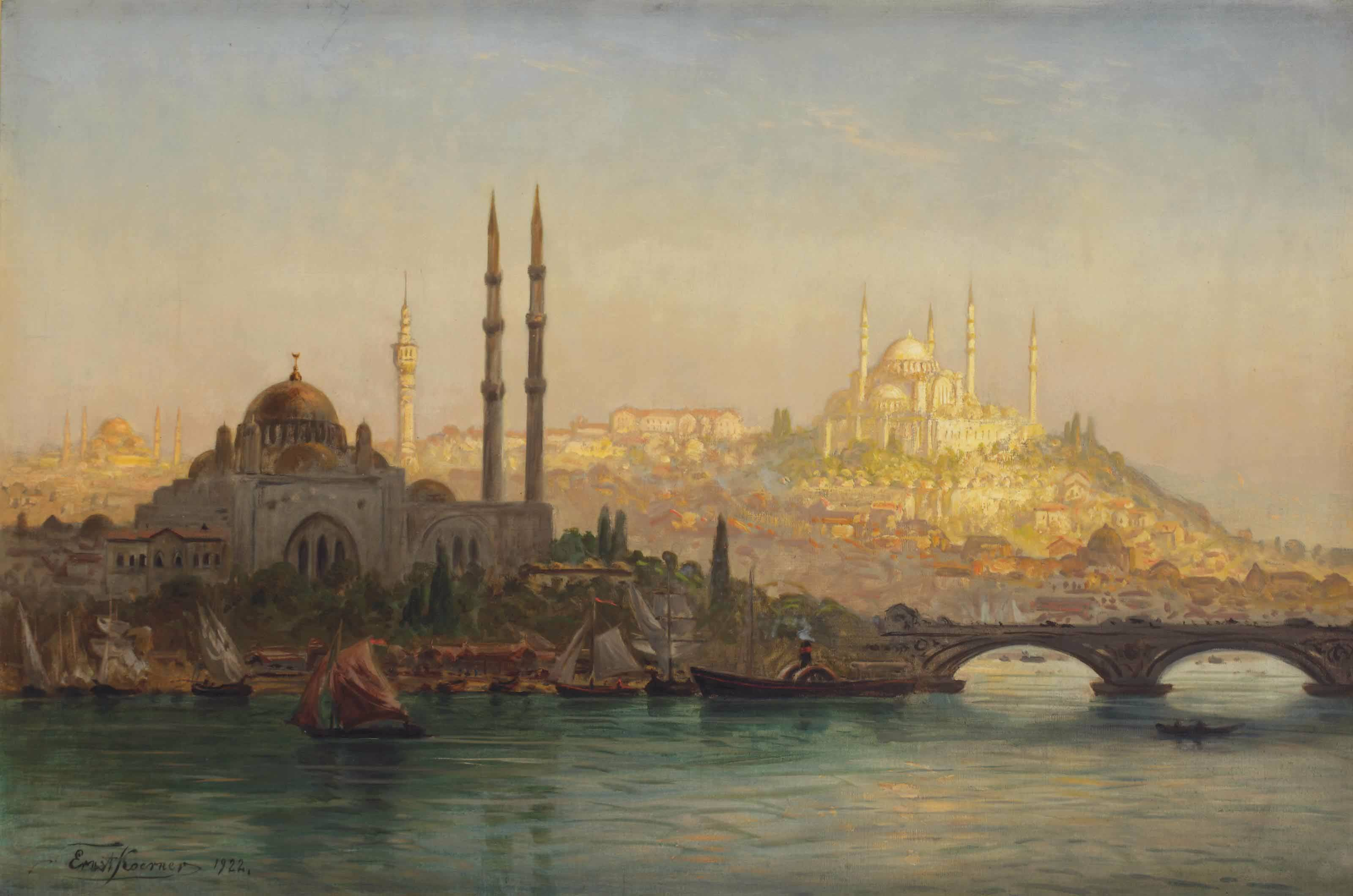
View of Istanbul (1922)

Ernst Karl Eugen Koerner (3 November 1846 – 30 July 1927) was a German landscape painter.

== Biography ==
Koerner was born in Stibbe near Marienwerder. His father, Ernst (1794–1856), was a cloth dealer. In 1861, while still attending the public schools, he began working in the studios of Hermann Eschke, where he received most of his artistic education. Later, he also worked for Karl Steffeck and Gottlieb Biermann. He spent most of the two following decades travelling; to the North Sea, the Baltics, the Harz Mountains, France, England, Italy, Scotland and Spain. From 1873 to 1886, he made numerous trips to Egypt and the Middle East, where he created some of his best-known paintings.

In 1874, he married Auguste Heyl (1855–1899), the daughter of a factory manager. They had one daughter and three sons, including the jurist Bernhard Koerner, who later became a prominent Anti-Semite.

In 1894, he was named a Professor and, from 1895 to 1899, was Chairman of the Verein Berliner Kunstler (Artists' Association). In addition to his canvases, he painted altarpieces at the Erlöserkirche in Berlin-Rummelsburg.

He died at home in Berlin, aged eighty, and is buried at the Luisenstädtischer Friedhof in Berlin-Kreuzberg.

== Works ==
Koerner became known above all for his pictures of Egypt, in which he depicted ancient Egyptian architecture, sometimes associated with blood-red sunsets. His painting was influenced by Eduard Hildebrandt.

- The Golden Horn (1873, formerly owned by Emperor Frederick III)
- Suez (1874, formerly held by the museum in Szczecin)
- Mahmudieh Canal (1885)
- Baalbek in Lebanon
- Sea off Alexandria
- Colossi of Memnon at Sunset (1879)
- Siut in Upper Egypt in the afterglow
- Excavation of the Sphinx (1887)
- Temple of Karnak
- Pyramids at Memphis
- Pyramids of Giza in the morning mood
- Acropolis in Athens
- Courtyard in Seville
