= Walter Moras =

German painter

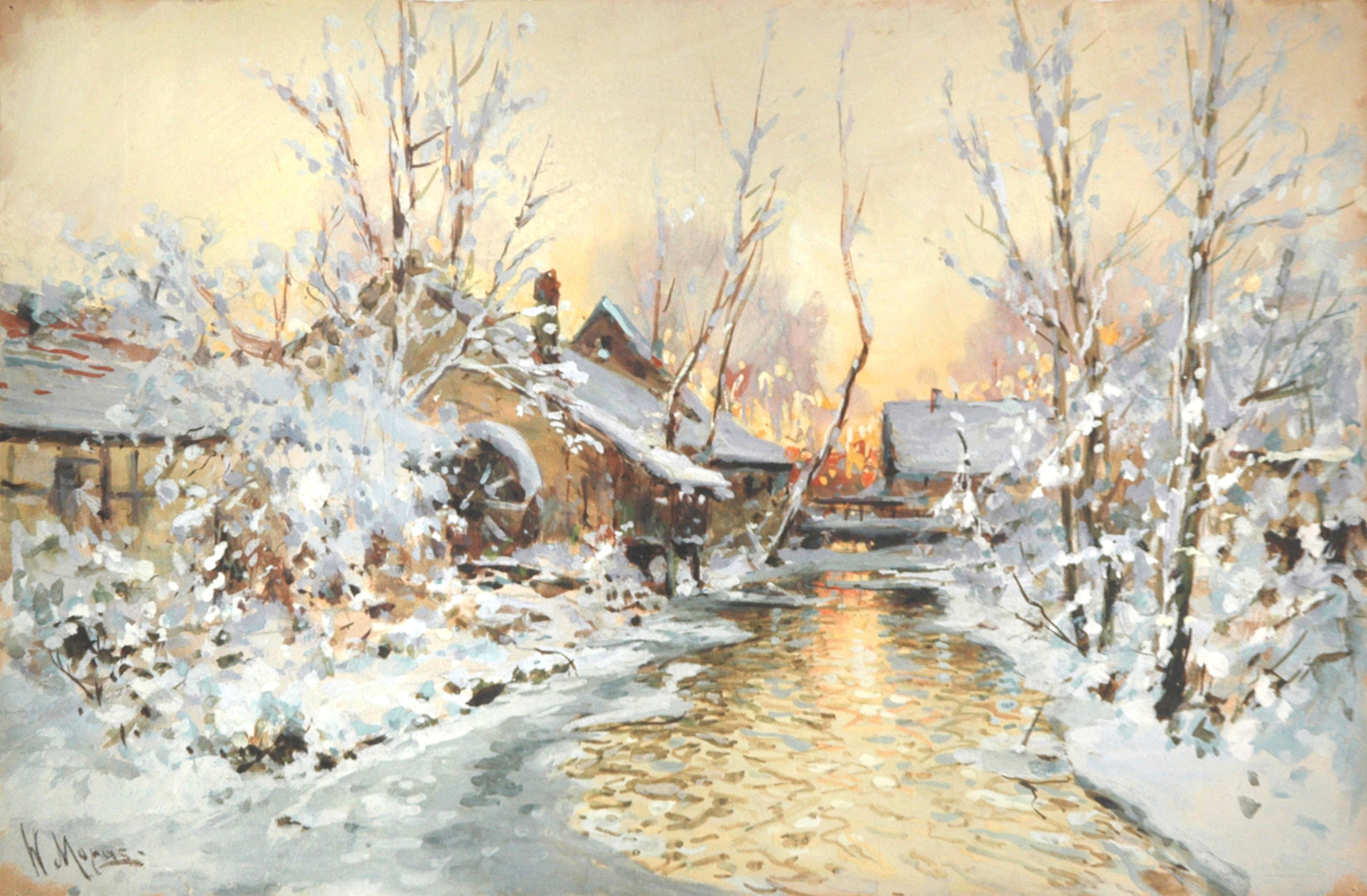
Moras: Snowy Mill

Walter Moras (Jan. 20, 1856 - March 6, 1925) was a German landscape painter who specialized to some extent in winter scenes.

== Life ==
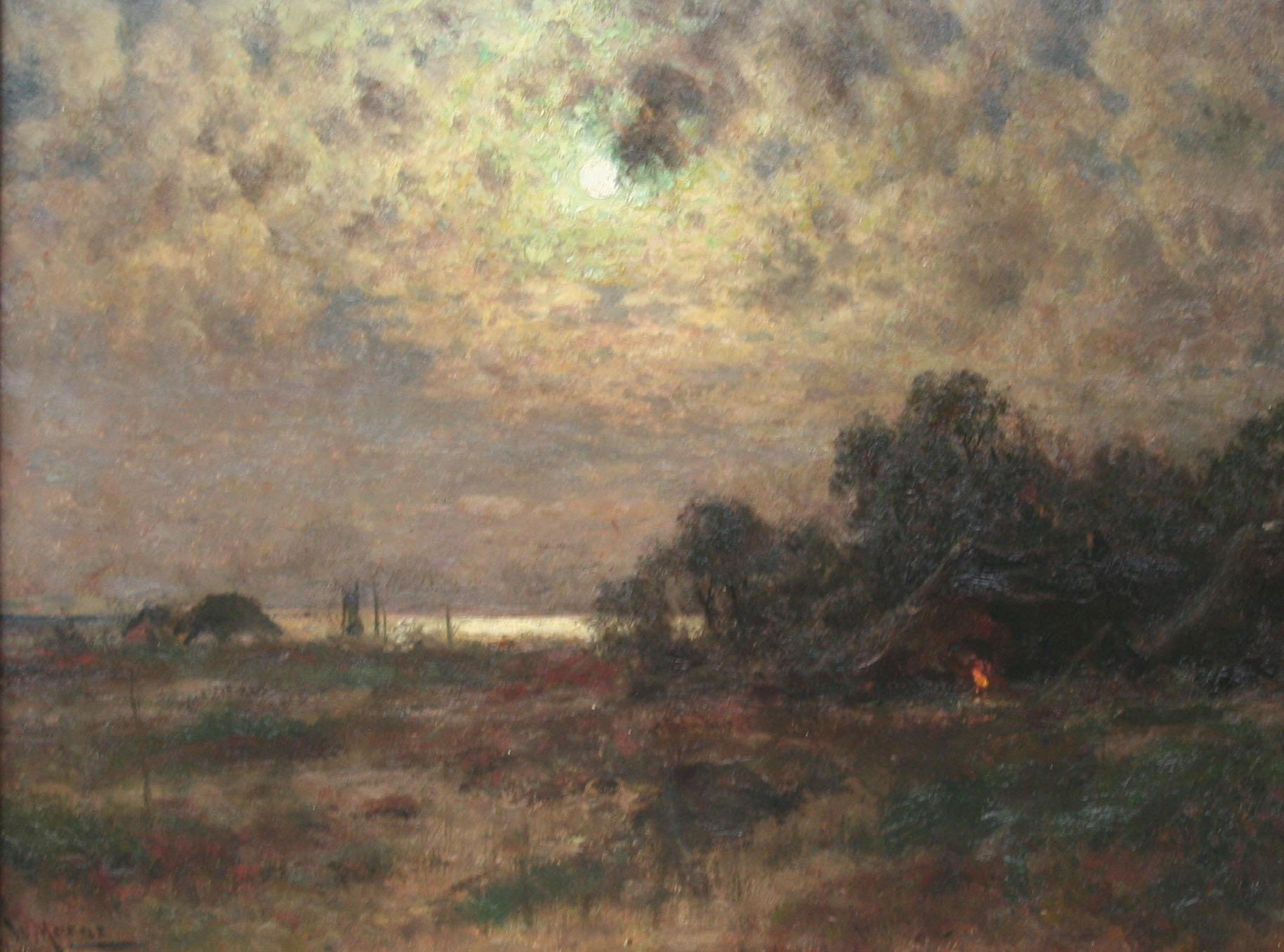
Walter Moras: Moonrise

Moras was significantly influenced by the marine and landscape painter Hermann Eschke (1823-1900). In Berlin, where Moras was born, he gained his artistic training in Eschke's studio. In 1876, the young Moras staged his first exhibition, at the Prussian Academy of Arts in Berlin. Thereafter, Moras's works were continually shown, in small numbers, at major Berlin art exhibits. Moras also participated in exhibits in Bremen, Oldenburg and Munich.

At Eschke's recommendation, the young Moras painted scenes in Mecklenburg and on the large, craggy German island of Rügen. He also painted in Norway, the Netherlands and Italy. However, many of his works were created in rural Brandenburg and later in the Spreewald, both in the region of Berlin. He scarcely painted at all in Berlin itself, even though was described as a "Berlin painter" all his life.

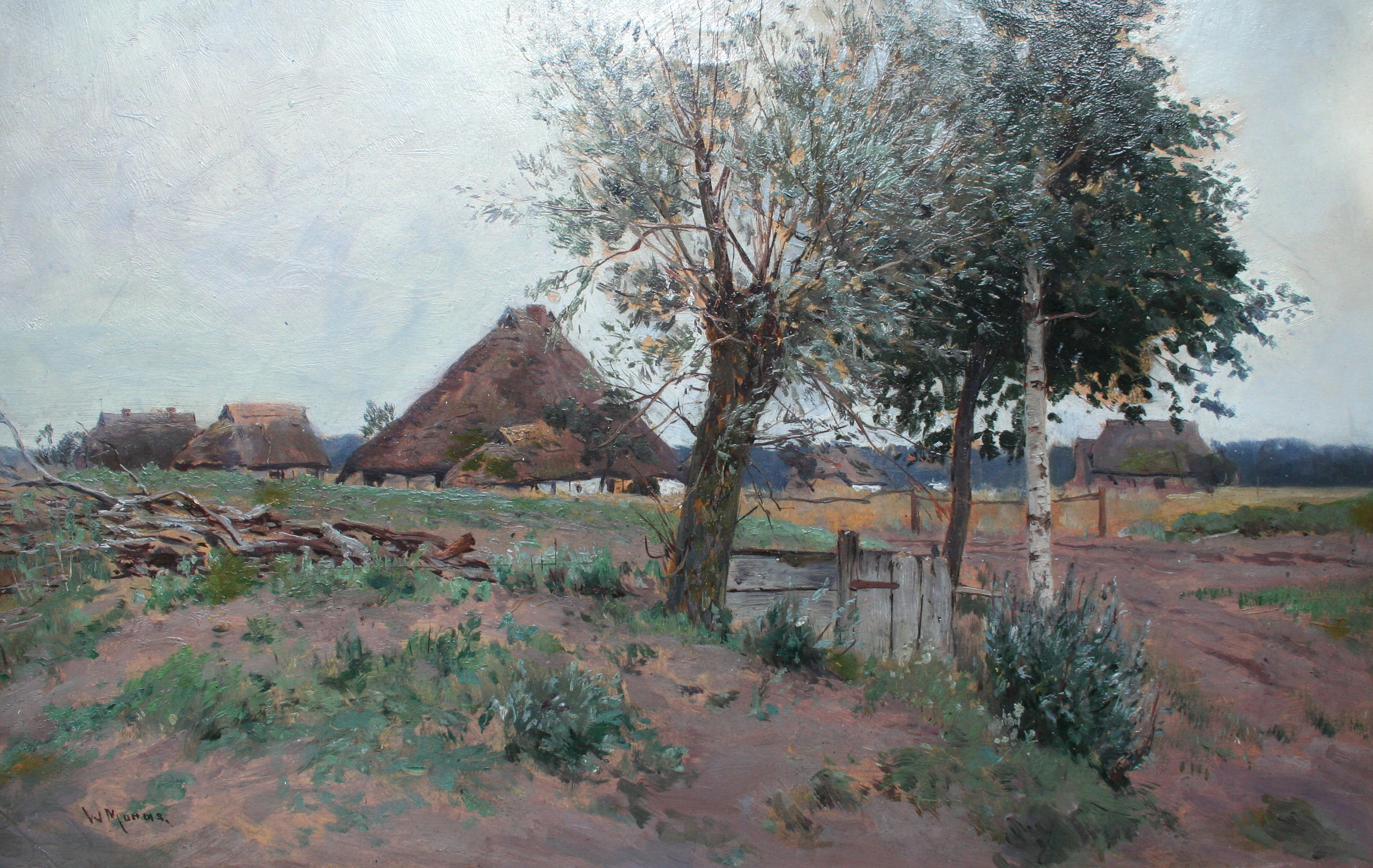
Moras: Brandenburg Village

Moras's style was realistic, influenced by a touch of melancholia, and generally simple and refined. Some of his evocative landscapes show Impressionistic influences. In later years he was known for large-format autumnal scenes illuminated by warm fall colors.

His numerous winter landscapes, which were composed with great attention to detail, similarly showed warmer hues amid the snowy context.

Moras was not a member of the Berlin Artists Association, nor did he become involved with any of the north German artists' colonies, though he sometimes painted in their neighborhoods.

In 1882 he married Ida Baluschek, the daughter of a Berlin railroad designer. Their son, Bruno, was born in 1883; Bruno Moras would also become a painter, but he was ever overshadowed by the reputation of his father.

== Selected paintings ==
Walter Moras
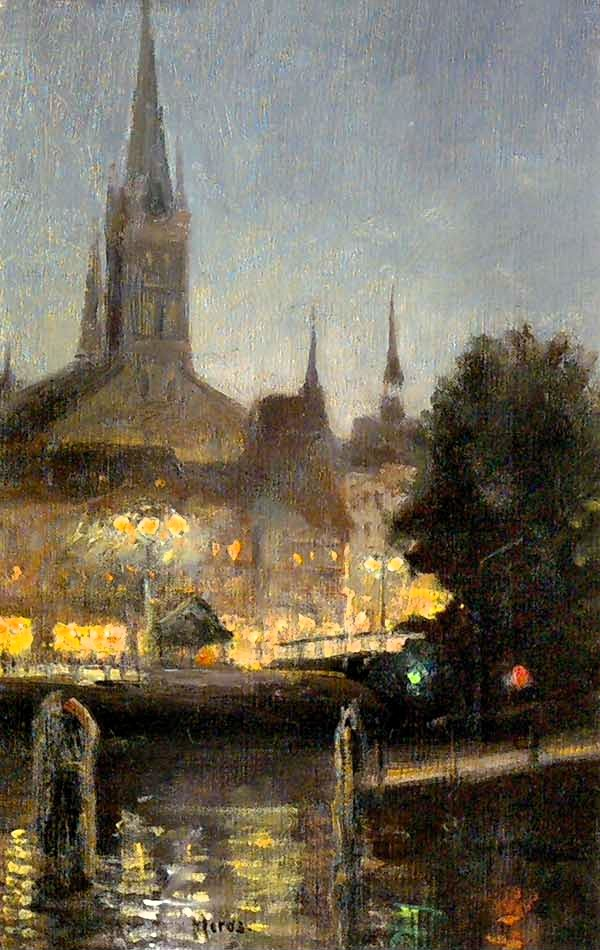
Lübeck by night

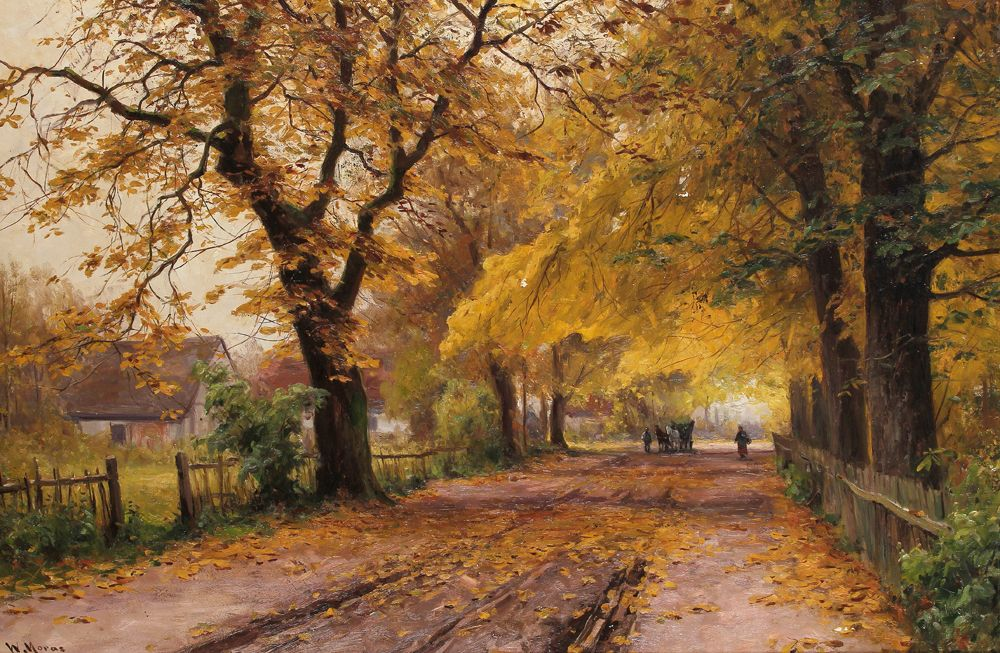
Autumnal Lane

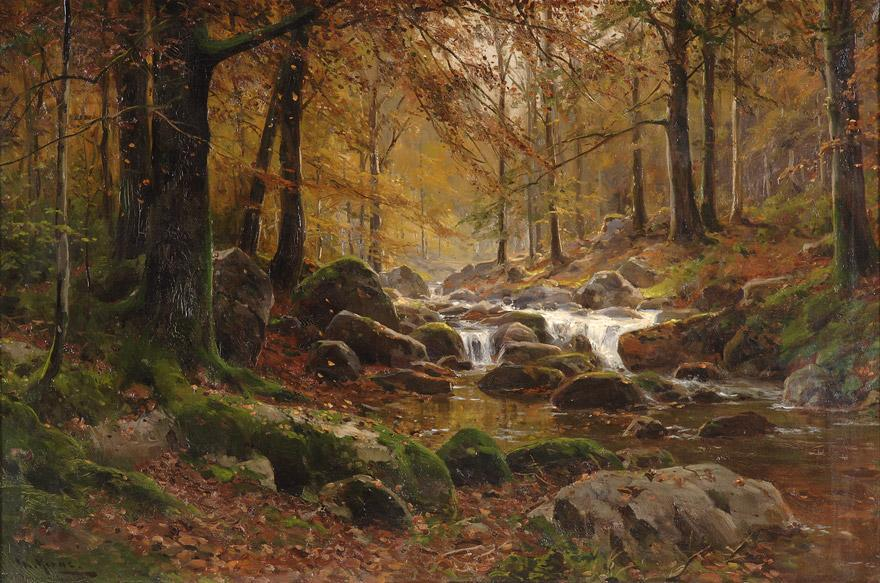
Forest Stream in Autumn

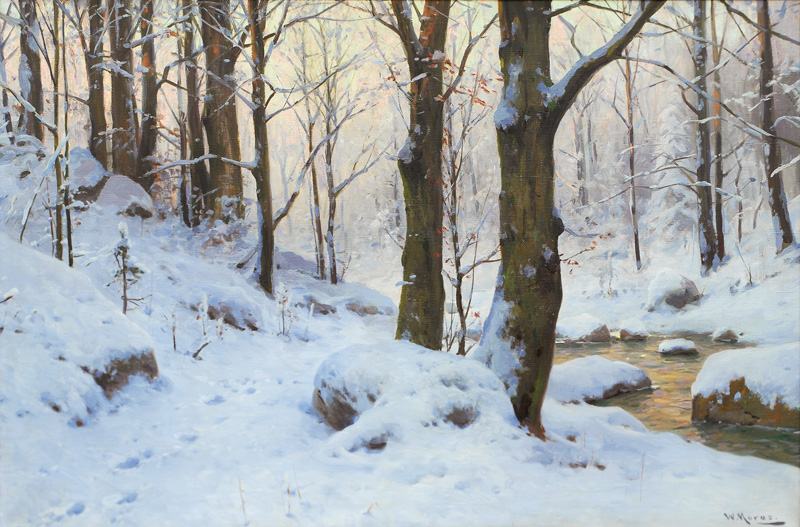
Stream in a Wintry Forest

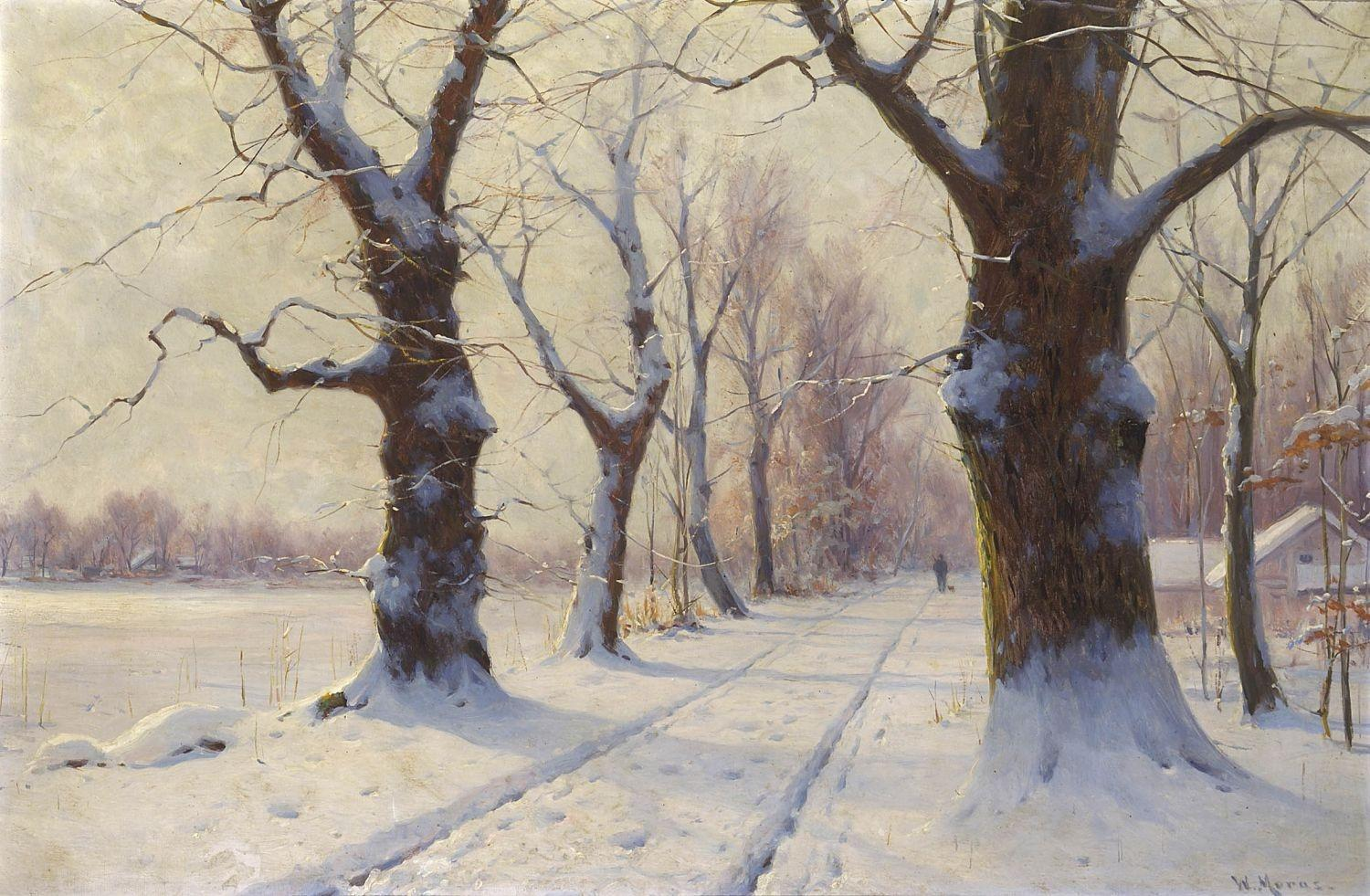
Wintry Lane

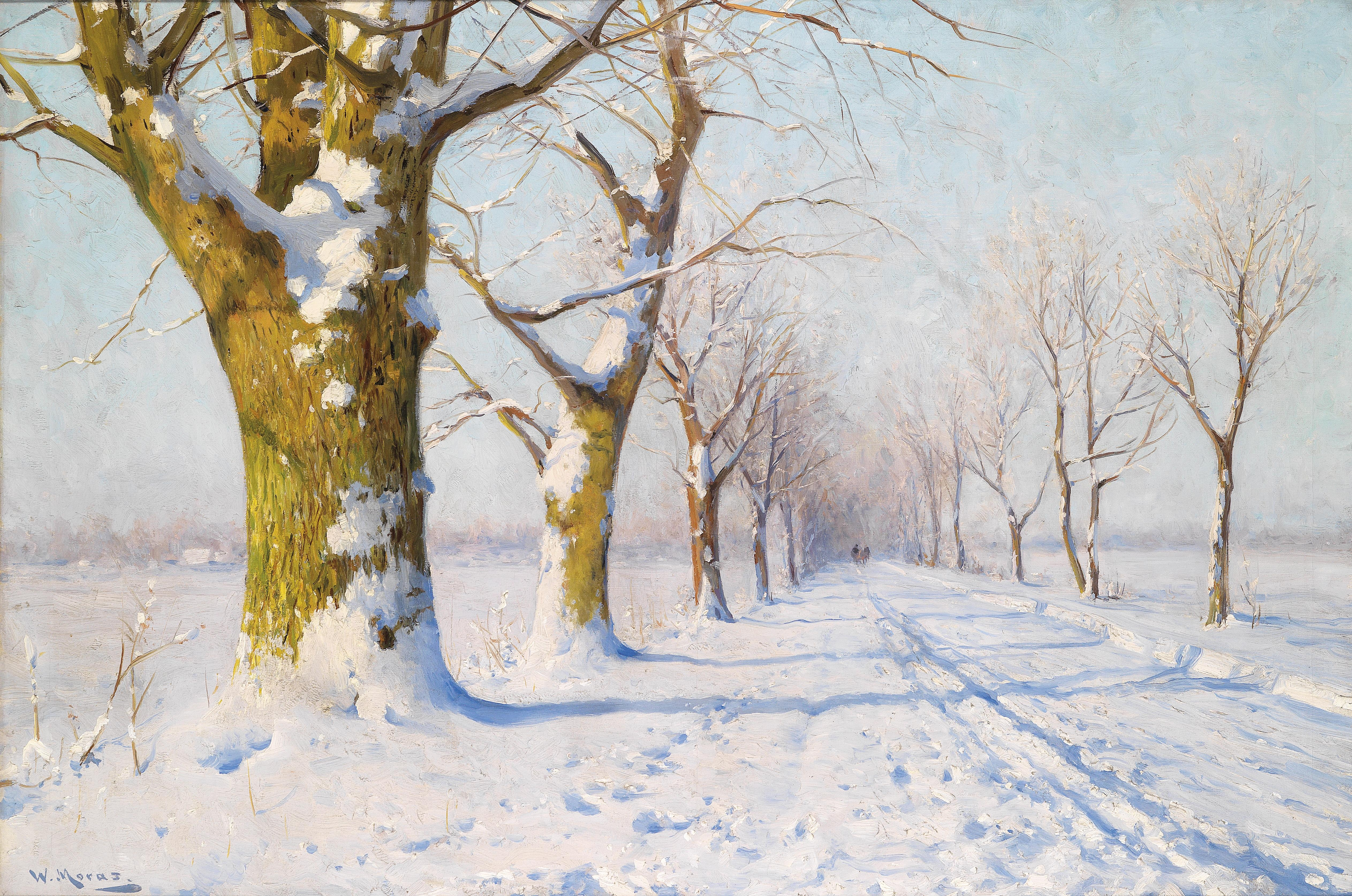
Sunny Winter Day

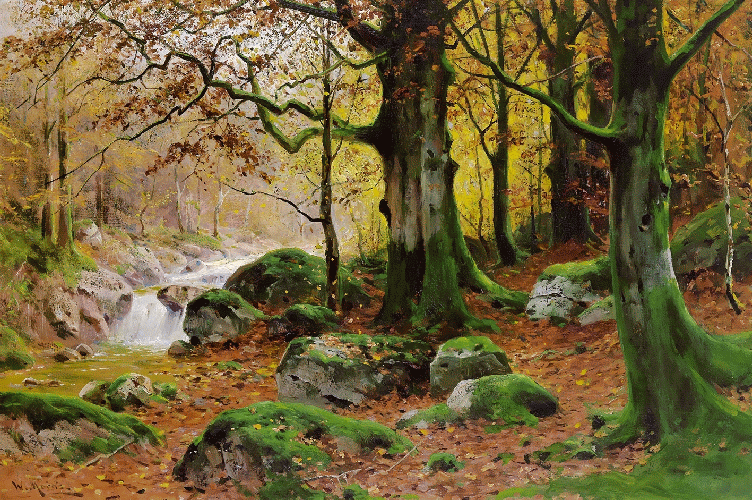
Autumnal Forest

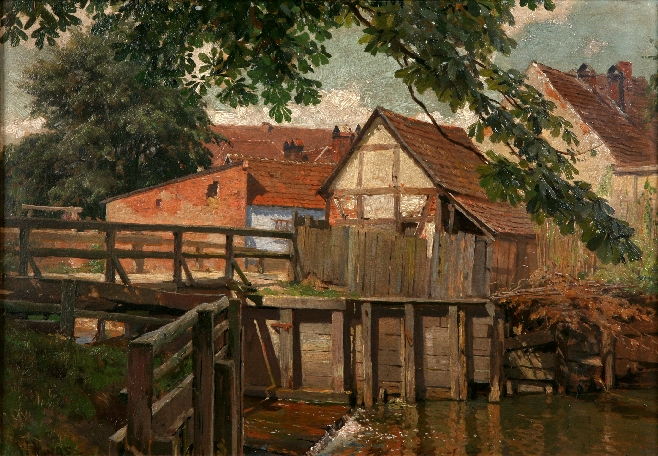
Scene in Lübben

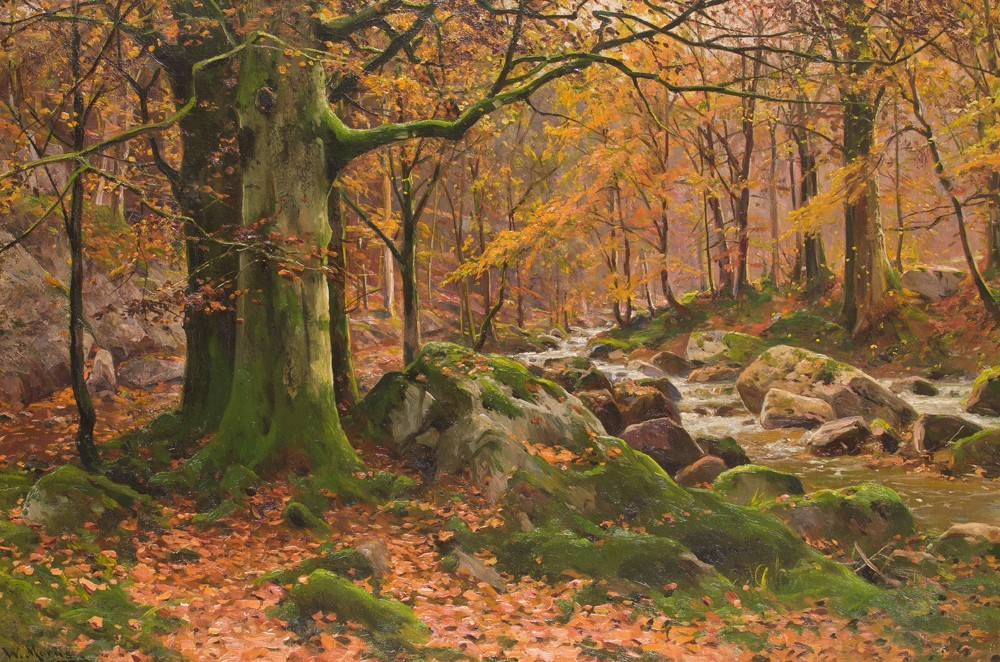
Forest Stream in Fall

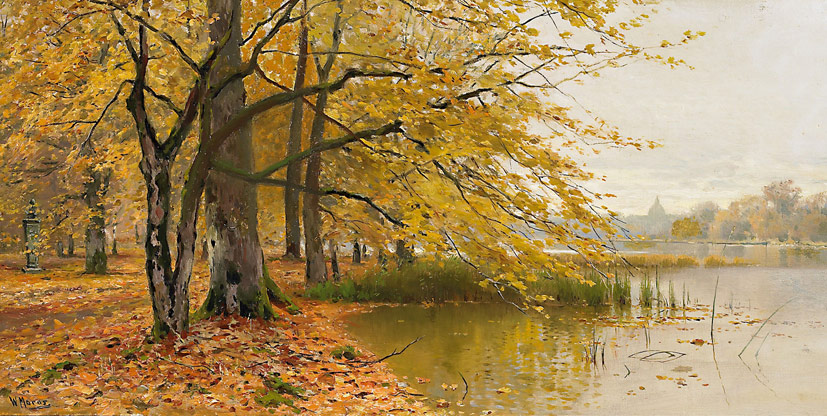
Fall Day in Potsdam

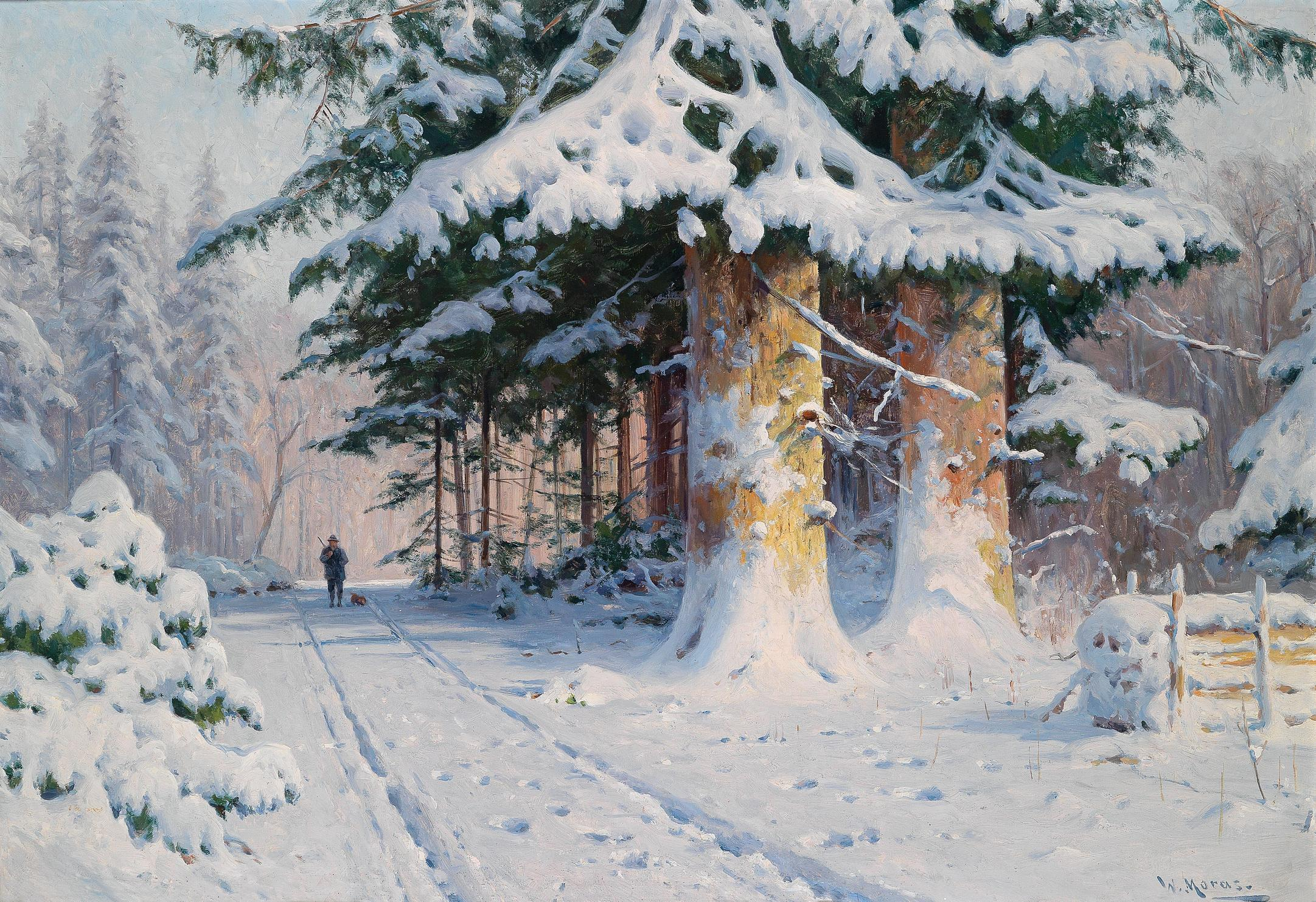
Hunter in a Wintry Forest

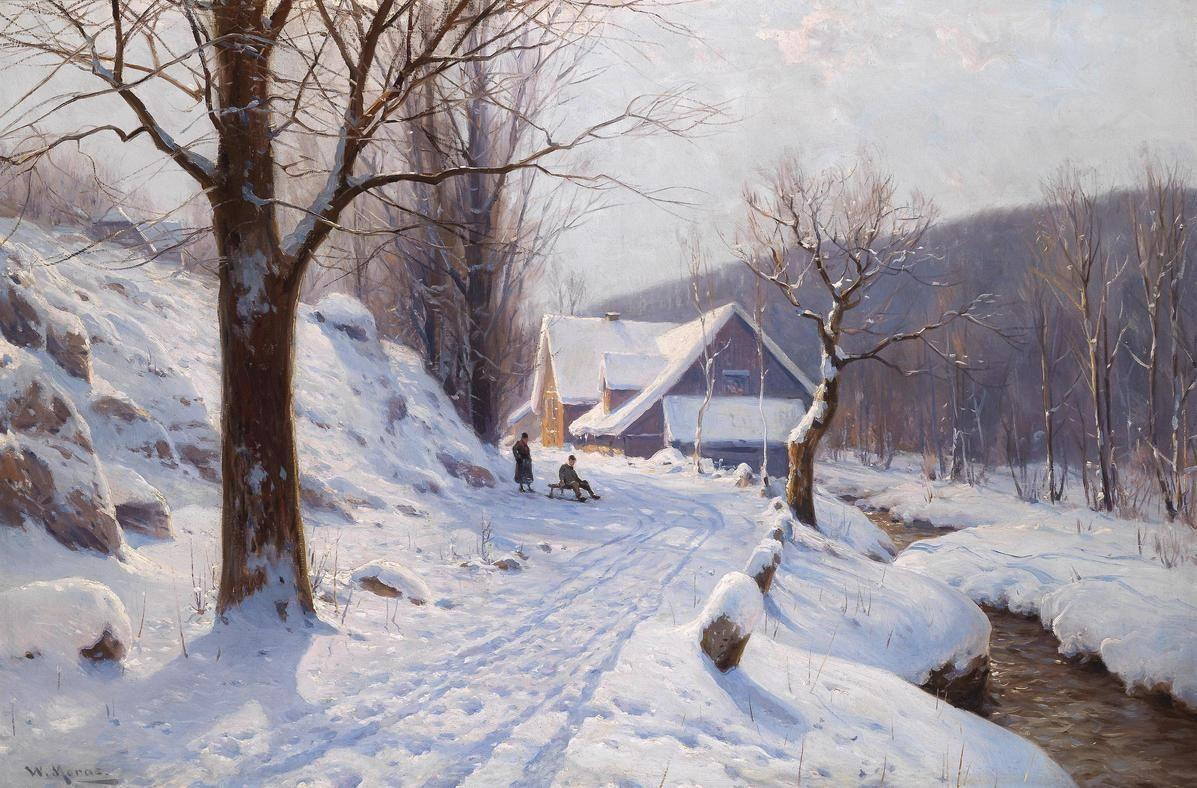
Sledding on a Sunny Day

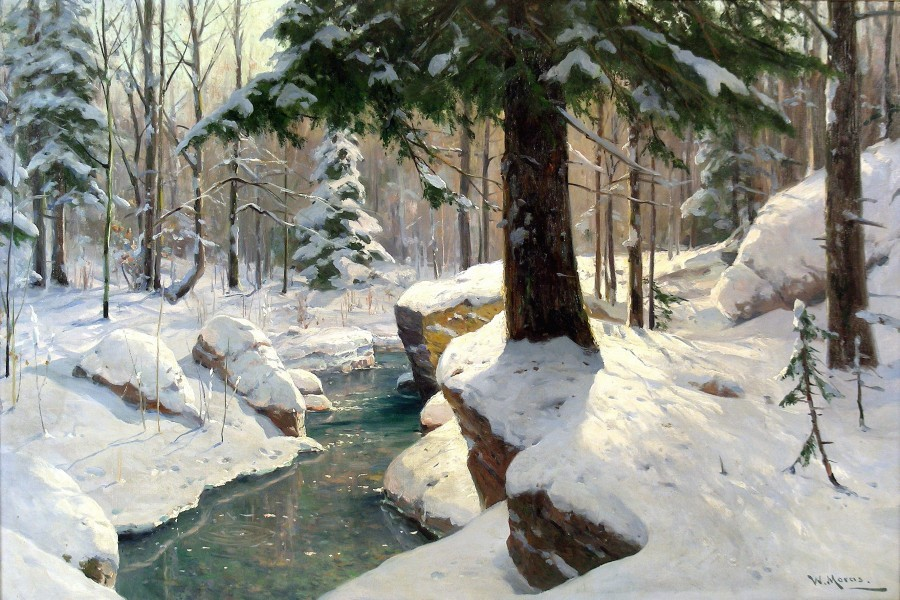
Snowy Stream

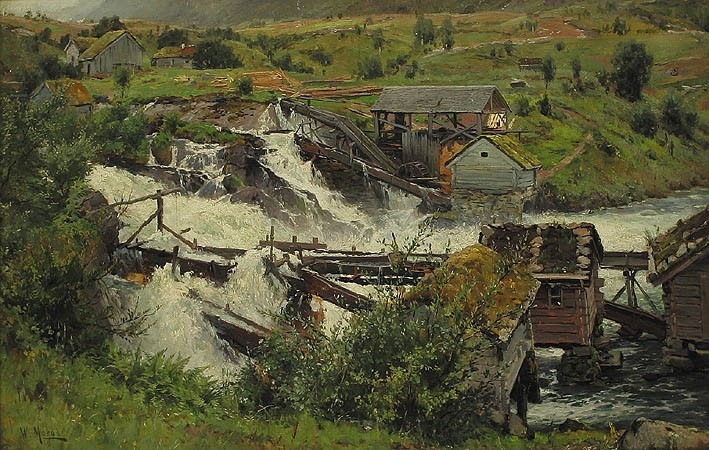
Sawmill in Norway

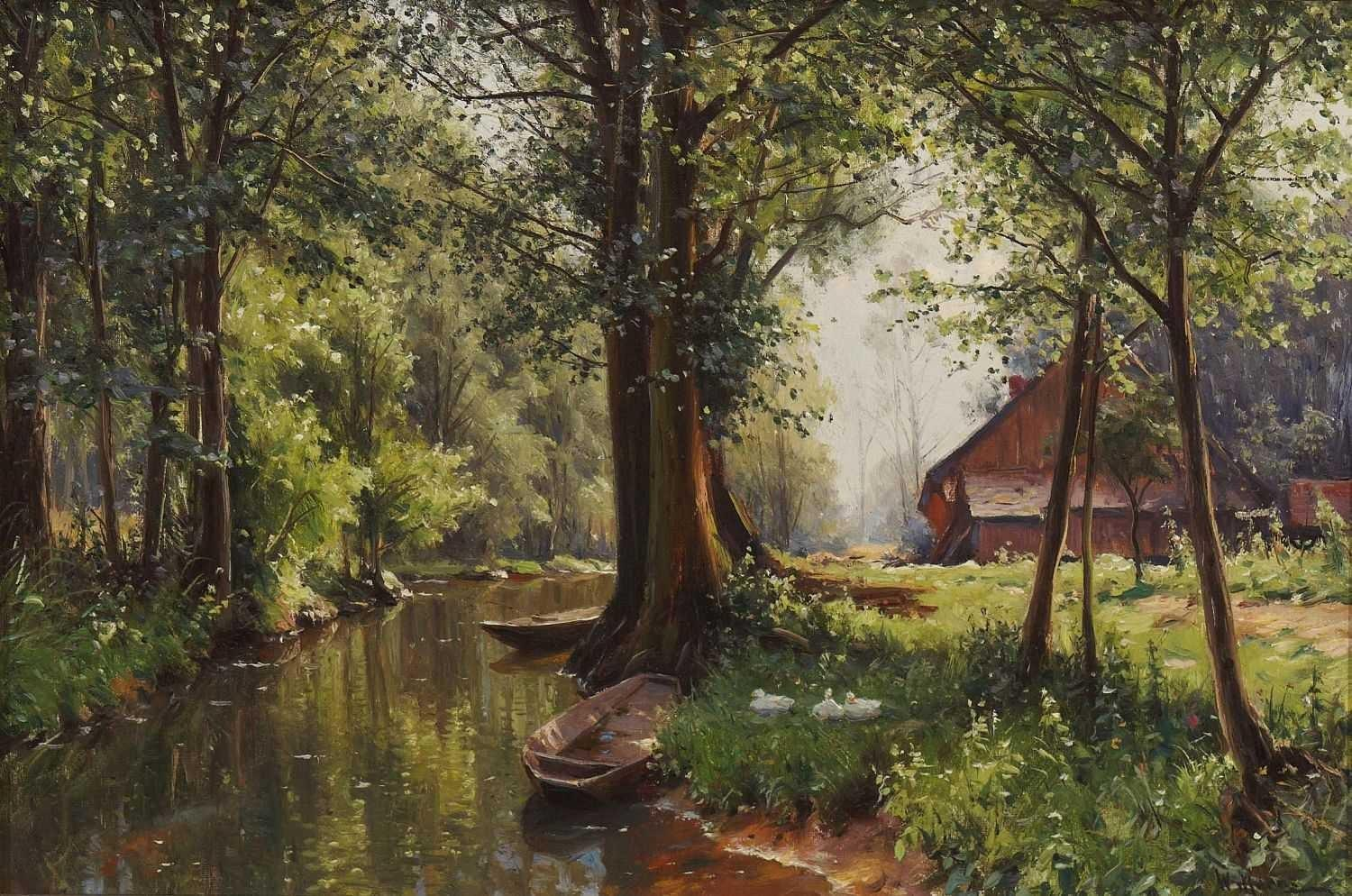
In the Spreewald

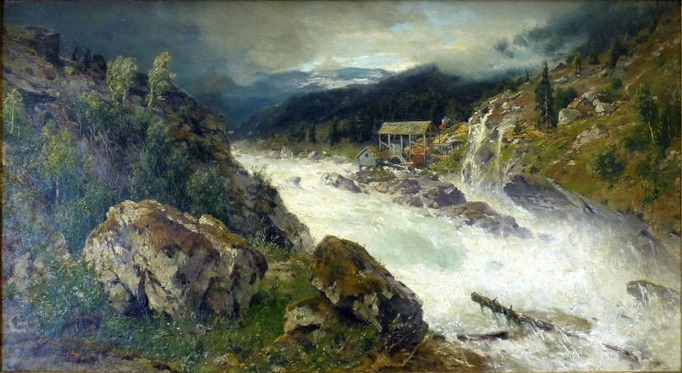
Raging Mountain Stream

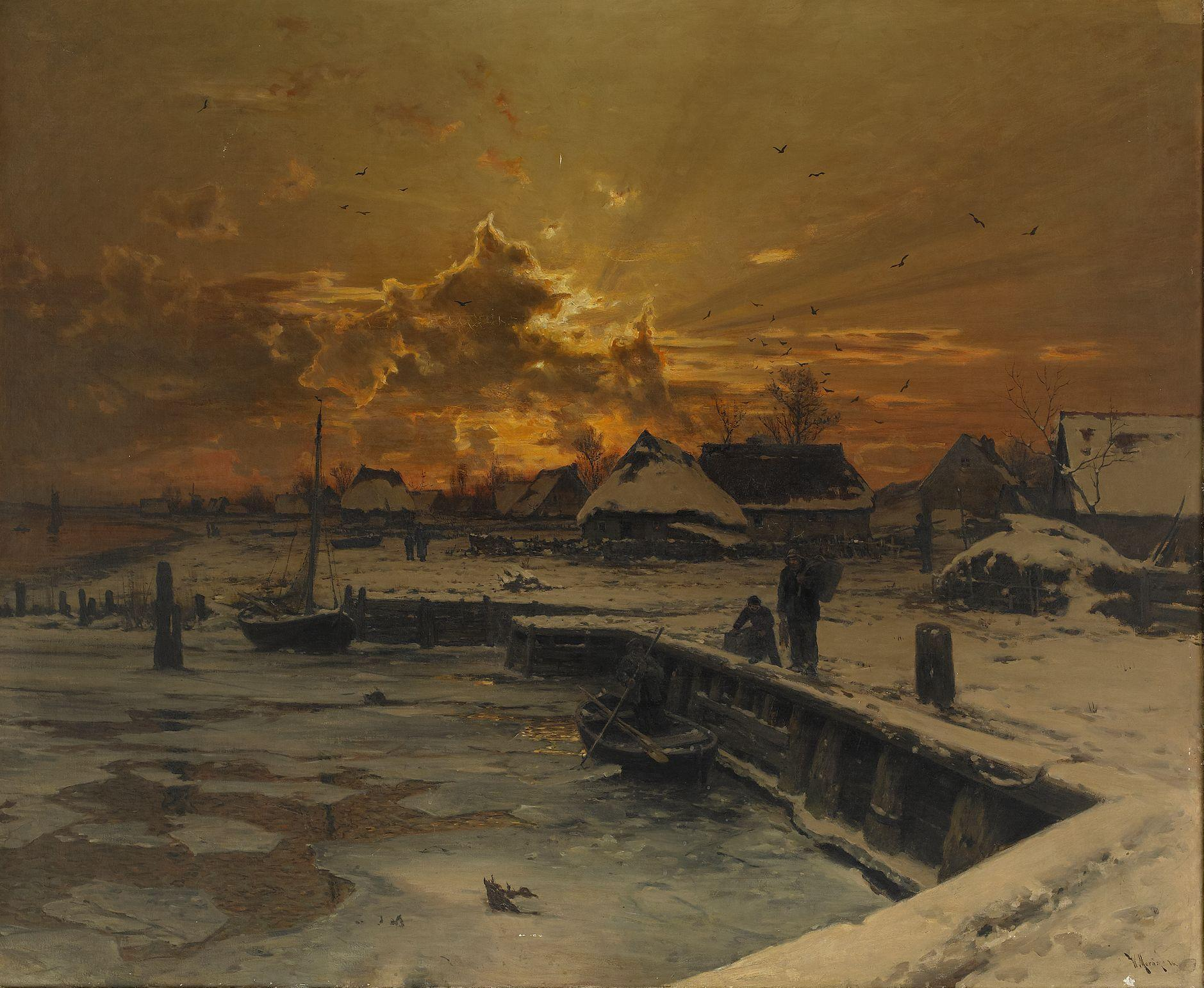
Fishing Village in Wintertime

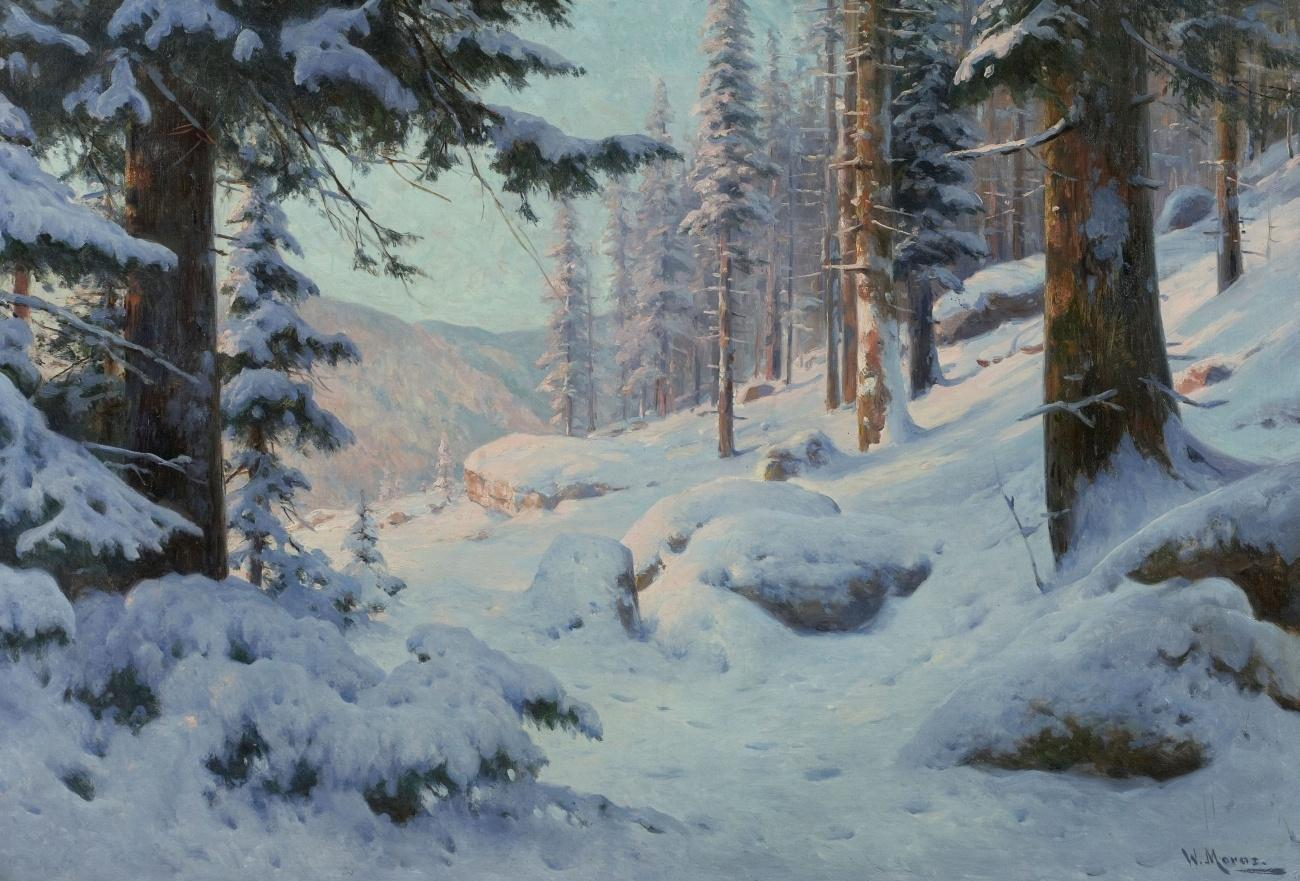
Snowy Forest Landscape

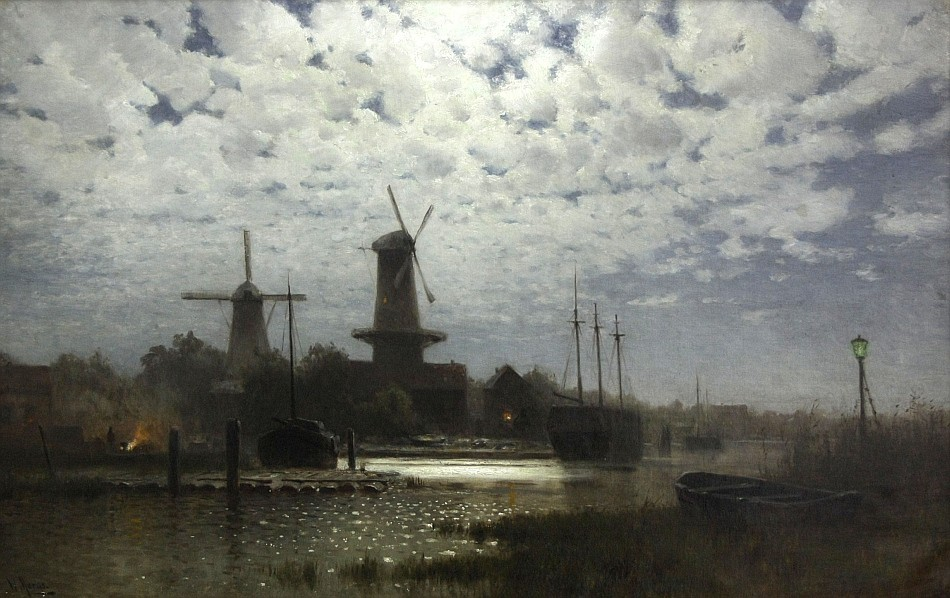
Moonlight in a Dutch Harbor
