= Wilhelm Krause (painter) =

German painter

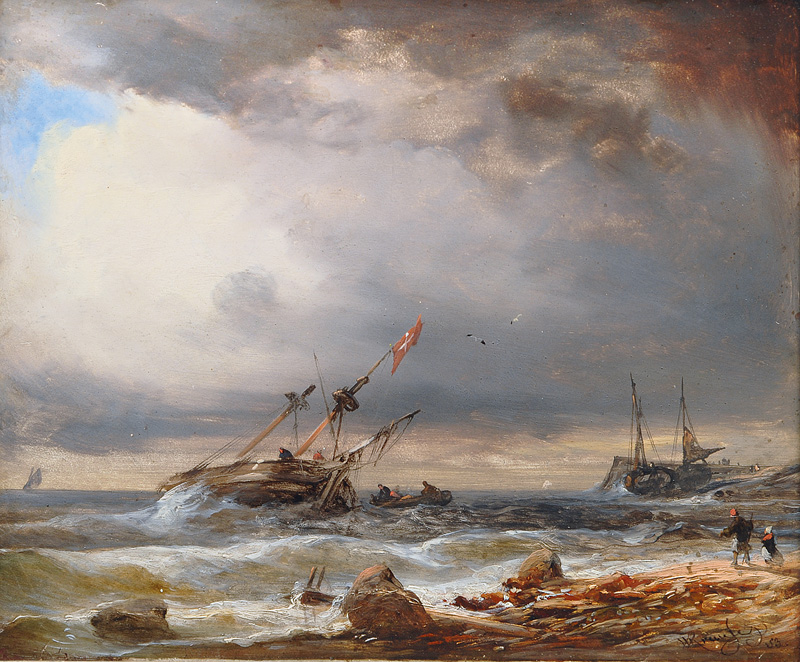
Danish Two-Master at a Small Port

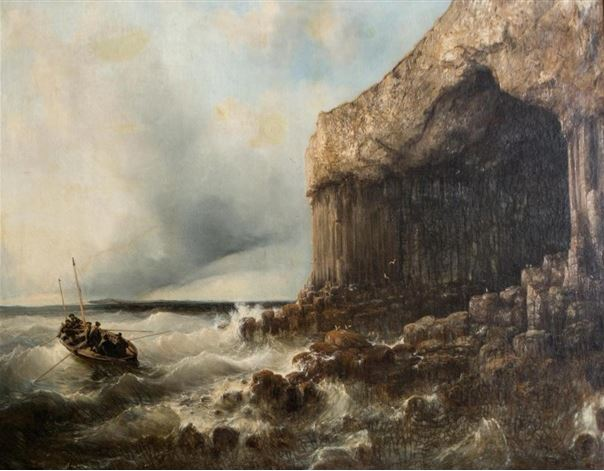
Grotto on the Coast of Italy

Wilhelm August Leopold Christian Krause (27 February 1803, Dessau – 8 January 1864, Berlin) was a German landscape and marine painter.

== Biography ==
He received his initial lessons in art from Carl Wilhelm Kolbe, who was sufficiently impressed by his talent that he helped him obtain a Ducal Scholarship; enabling him to study at the Dresden Academy of Fine Arts, beginning in 1821. He remained there for three years, while attempting to become a private student of Caspar David Friedrich. Those efforts were in vain so, in 1824, he relocated to Berlin, where he found employment with the stage designer and diorama painter, Karl Wilhelm Gropius. Later, he became a student of Karl Wilhelm Wach. During this time, he supported himself by singing at the Königsstädtisches Theater. By 1830, he was earning enough from his painting to devote himself to it exclusively.

He had decided to specialize in marine painting, but he always put some landscaping in the foreground. Several study trips to the sea were taken for inspiration. In 1830, he travelled with his friend, Rudolf Jordan, to Rügen. He also travelled to Norway (1831), Holland (1834) and Normandy (1836). He wandered further afield, to England and Scotland, in 1842. Later he undertook study trips to coasts of France, Italy and Greece.

He was the first to introduce marine painting to Berlin and attracted a group of followers there; notably Hermann Eschke, Eduard Hildebrandt, Charles Hoguet and Fritz Bamberger.

In 1833, the Prussian Academy of Sciences accepted him as a full member. he published a book in 1846: Painting Techniques of the Masters of the 15th to 18th Century, rediscovered by Prof. Wilhelm Krause in Berlin.
