= Louis Douzette =

German painter

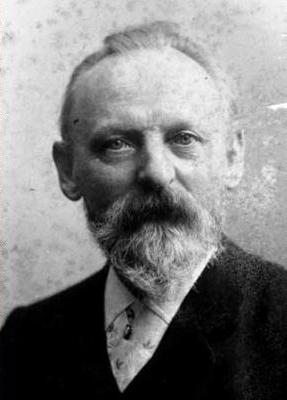
Louis Douzette (c.1900)

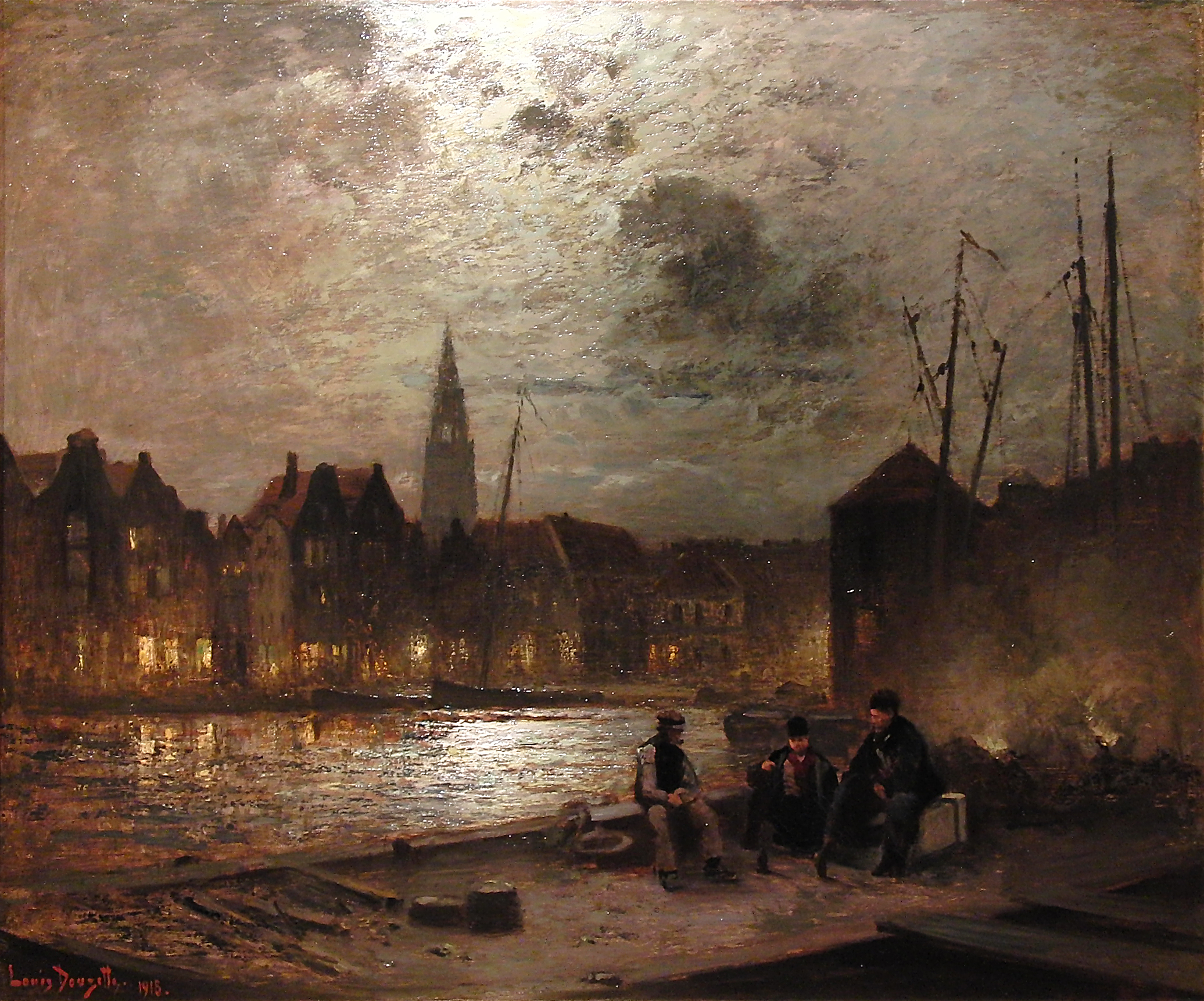
The Port by Moonlight

Carl Ludwig Christoph Douzette, known as Louis (25 September 1834 – 21 February 1924) was a German landscape painter.

== Life and work ==
He was descended from Huguenots that fled France in the 17th century. He was born in Tribsees. When he was seven, his family moved to Franzburg. At the age of fourteen, he graduated from secondary school and began working with his father's company, as a decorative painter. During slow periods, he was given drawing lessons by his father, who had attended the Prussian Academy of Arts as a boy. In 1852, they moved to Berlin.

At the age of twenty-one, he became a student of Hermann Eschke. After 1860, he spent time painting along the Baltic coast, on Rügen and at Darß. He became a member of the Verein Berliner Künstler (artists' association) in 1863. Two years later, he married Louise Donner (1839–1890). They would have four daughters. During a visit to Paris, in 1878, he was influenced by the Barbizon School and took up painting en plein aire. His moody pictures of night landscapes earned him the nickname "Moonlight Douzette".

He later became associated with the artists' colony in Ahrenshoop. From 1895 until his death, he lived in a villa in Barth, with his two youngest daughters. Later, they were joined by his third daughter and her husband, the painter Adolf Gustav Döring. In 1896, he was named a professor at the Prussian Academy. On the occasion of his seventy-sixth birthday, in 1910, the city of Barth granted him honorary citizenship. He died at his home, aged eighty-nine.

== Sources ==
- Gerd Albrecht (Ed.): Louis Douzette: Landschaftsmaler 1834–1924, exhibition catalog for "Louis Douzette – ein herausragender Landschaftsmaler Norddeutschlands und ein Magier der Nacht", 2009, Vineta-Museum, Barth, Fischerhude ISBN 978-3-88132-094-8
- Michael Lissok: "Douzette, Louis (1834–1924)", In: Dirk Alvermann, Nils Jörn (Eds.): Biographisches Lexikon für Pommern, Vol.1 (Veröffentlichungen der Historischen Kommission für Pommern), Böhlau Verlag, 2013, pp. 56–59 ISBN 978-3-412-20936-0
- Jörg Scheffelke: Louis Douzette – Ein Malerleben in Berlin und Vorpommern. Verlag Atelier im Bauernhaus, Fischerhude 2004, ISBN 3-88132-090-3
- Ewald Bender, "Douzette, Louis (Carl Ludwig Christoph)", In: Allgemeines Lexikon der Bildenden Künstler von der Antike bis zur Gegenwart, Vol. 9: Delaulne–Dubois, E. A. Seemann, Leipzig 1913 (Online)
