= Elisabeth Reuter =

German painter

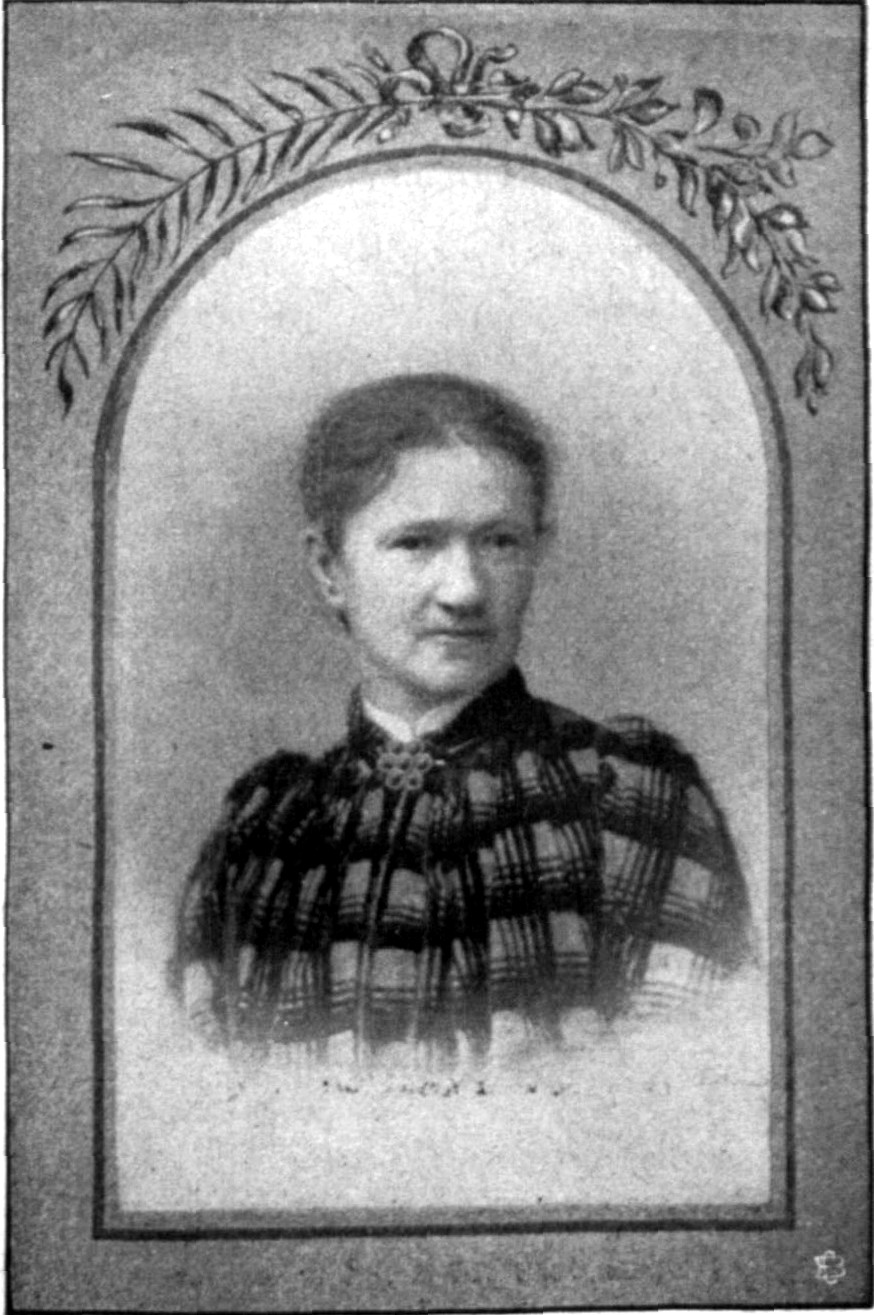
Elisabeth Reuter (date unknown)

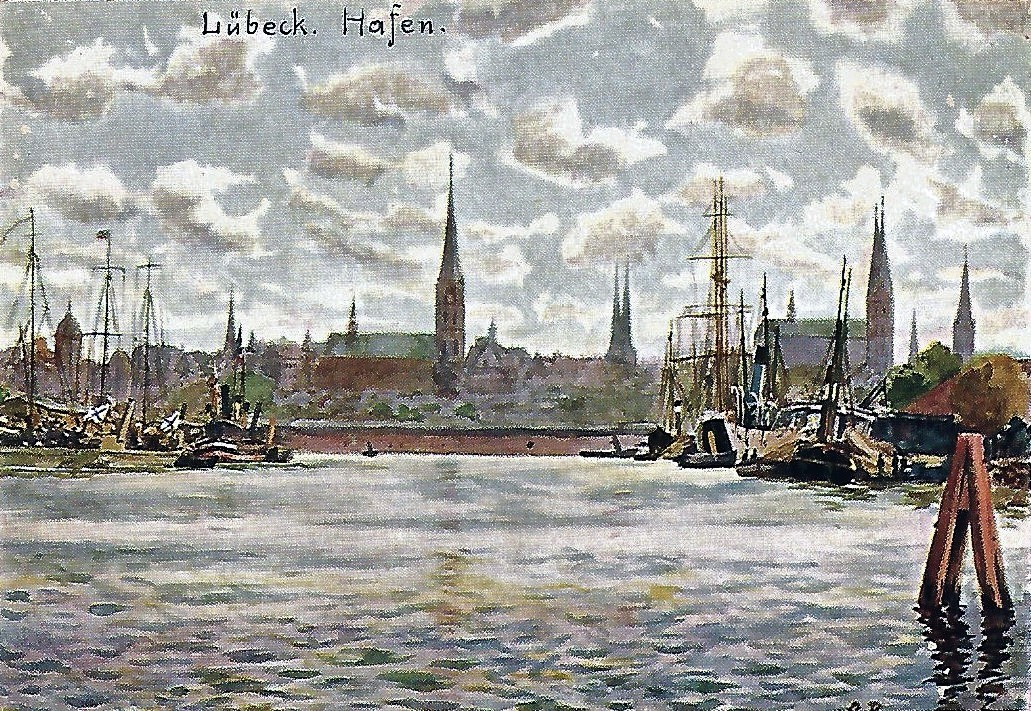
The Port of Lübeck (watercolor postcard)

Elisabeth Reuter (21 September 1853 in Lübeck – 7 May 1903 in Heidelberg) was a German landscape painter.

== Biography ==
She was born to Gottlob Reuter, a doctor, and his wife, Elise née Trummer. Her uncle was the Lutheran church leader, Ludwig Trummer. Her sister, Ada, was married to the poet, Emanuel Geibel. She showed an early aptitude for art, and was encouraged by her parents.

In 1873, at the age of twenty, she began her studies in Munich with Max Kuhn and later worked with Julius Zimmermann; concentrating on watercolors, which were popular and sold well.

She then went to Hamburg with August Eduard Schliecker, who taught her architectural painting. Towards the end of the 1880s, she lived in Rotenburg, where she created some of her best-known works. Later, she went to Friedrichsruh and was employed by Otto von Bismarck, who commissioned paintings of his park and estate, and made her part of the family circle.

At the start of the 1890s, she turned to oil painting; taking lessons from Hermann Eschke in Berlin then, in 1893, spending a year in Düsseldorf with Gustav Adolf Schweitzer. This was followed by several years of travelling and painting the fjords in Norway. For two years, she had a studio in Helgeland. Upon returning to Lübeck, she became a drawing teacher.

Three weeks before her death, she went to the Black Forest on a painting expedition. During her work near Heidelberg Castle she caught a severe cold that turned into a fatal pulmonary inflammation.

== Sources ==
- "Elisabeth Reuter", In: Ulrich Thieme, Felix Becker (Eds.): Allgemeines Lexikon der Bildenden Künstler von der Antike bis zur Gegenwart. Vol.28, E. A. Seemann, Leipzig 1934, pg.199
- Lübeckische Blätter,. Vol.45, #20, 1903, pg.262 (obituary)
- "Eine Lübecker Künstlerin." In: Vaterstädtische Blätter, 1903, Nr. 20, 17 May 1903 (obituary)
- Gustav Lindke: Alte Lübecker Stadtansichten, Lübeck 1968, Nrs. 190, 250, 254
