= Eduard Hildebrandt =

German painter (1818–1868)

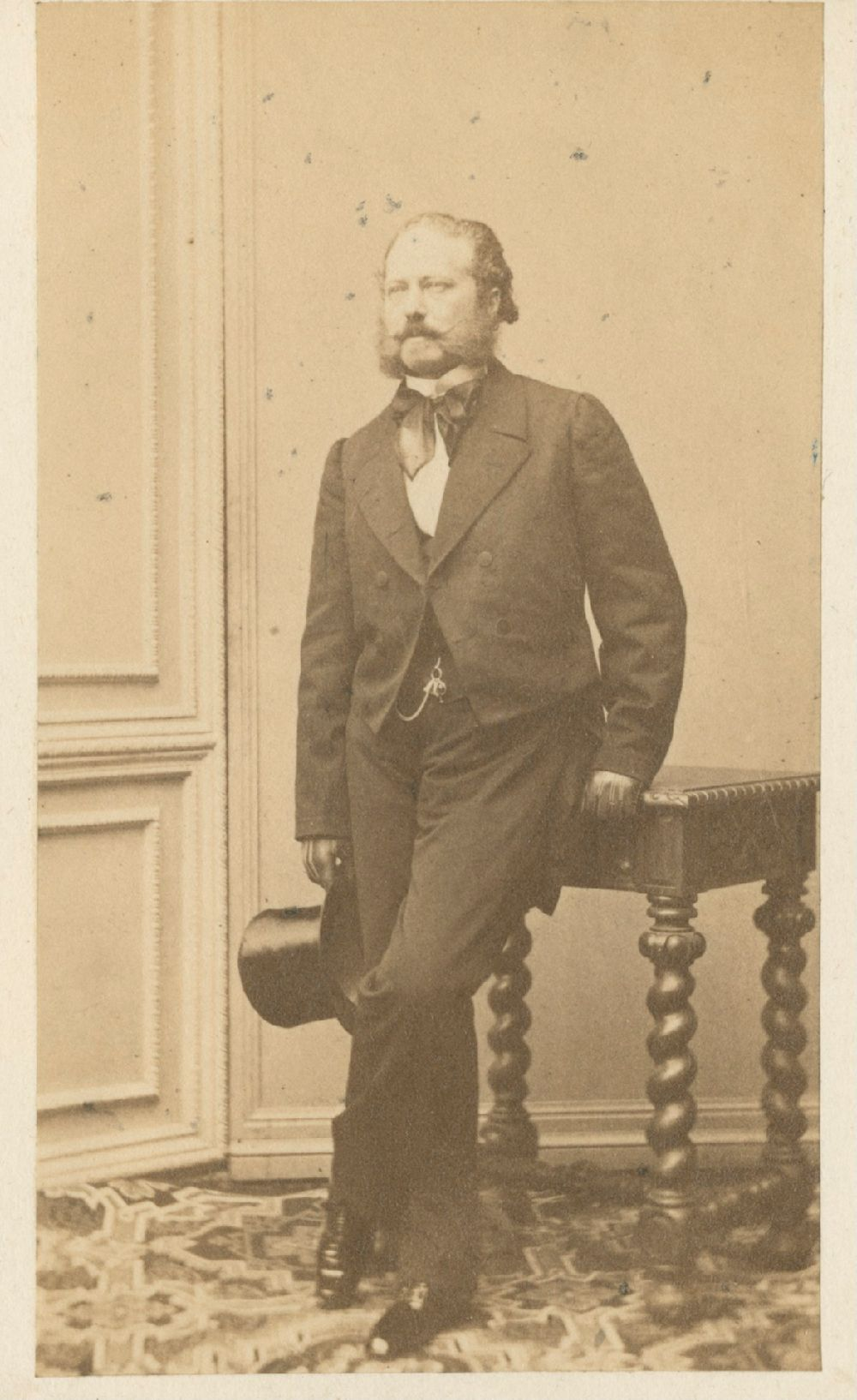
Eduard Hildebrandt by G. & A. Overbeck (firm), c. 1868

Eduard Hildebrandt (9 September 1818 in Danzig – 25 October 1868 in Berlin) was a German landscape painter.

== Biography ==
He served as apprentice to his father, a house-painter at Danzig. He was not twenty when he moved to Berlin, where he was taken in hand by Wilhelm Krause, a painter of sea pieces. Several early pieces exhibited after his death—a breakwater, dated 1838, ships in a breeze off Swinemünde (1840), and other canvases of this and the following year—show Hildebrandt to have been a careful student of nature, with inborn talents kept down by the conventionalisms of the formal school to which Krause belonged.

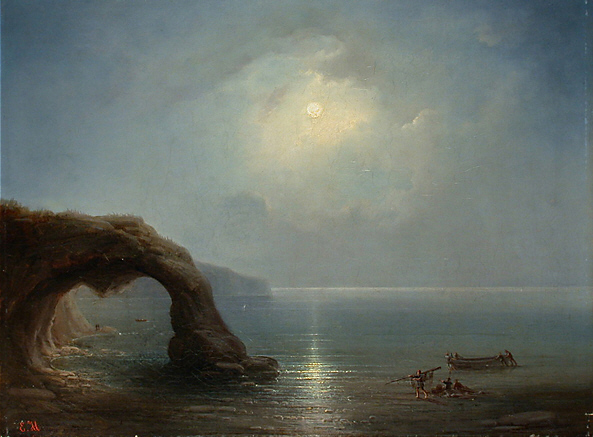
Capri

Accident made him acquainted with masterpieces of French art displayed at the Berlin Academy, and these awakened his curiosity and envy. He went to Paris, where, about 1842, he entered the atelier of Isabey and became the companion of Lepoittevin. In a short time he sent home pictures which might have been taken for copies from these artists. Gradually he mastered the mysteries of touch and the secrets of effect in which the French at this period excelled.

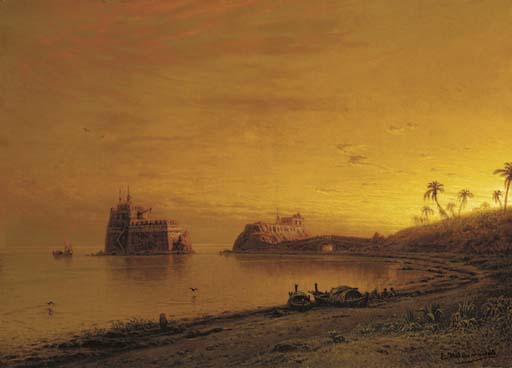
Loo Rock and Ponthina, Madeira

He also acquired the necessary skill in painting figures, and returned to Germany, skilled in the rendering of many kinds of landscape forms. His pictures of French street life, done about 1843, while impressed with the stamp of the Paris school, reveal a spirit eager for novelty, quick at grasping, equally quick at rendering, momentary changes of tone and atmosphere.

After 1843, under the influence of Alexander von Humboldt and with the financial support of the Prussian King Frederick William IV, Hildebrandt expanded his travels. In 1844, he traveled to Brazil and North America. Hildebrandt's fourth journey in 1851 took him through Italy, Egypt and Syria to Palestine. He returned to Berlin via Turkey and Greece. Between 1861 and 1862, Hildebrandt undertook his last art trip, which turned into a world tour. Hildebrandt returned home with over 300 watercolors, drawings and oil paintings.

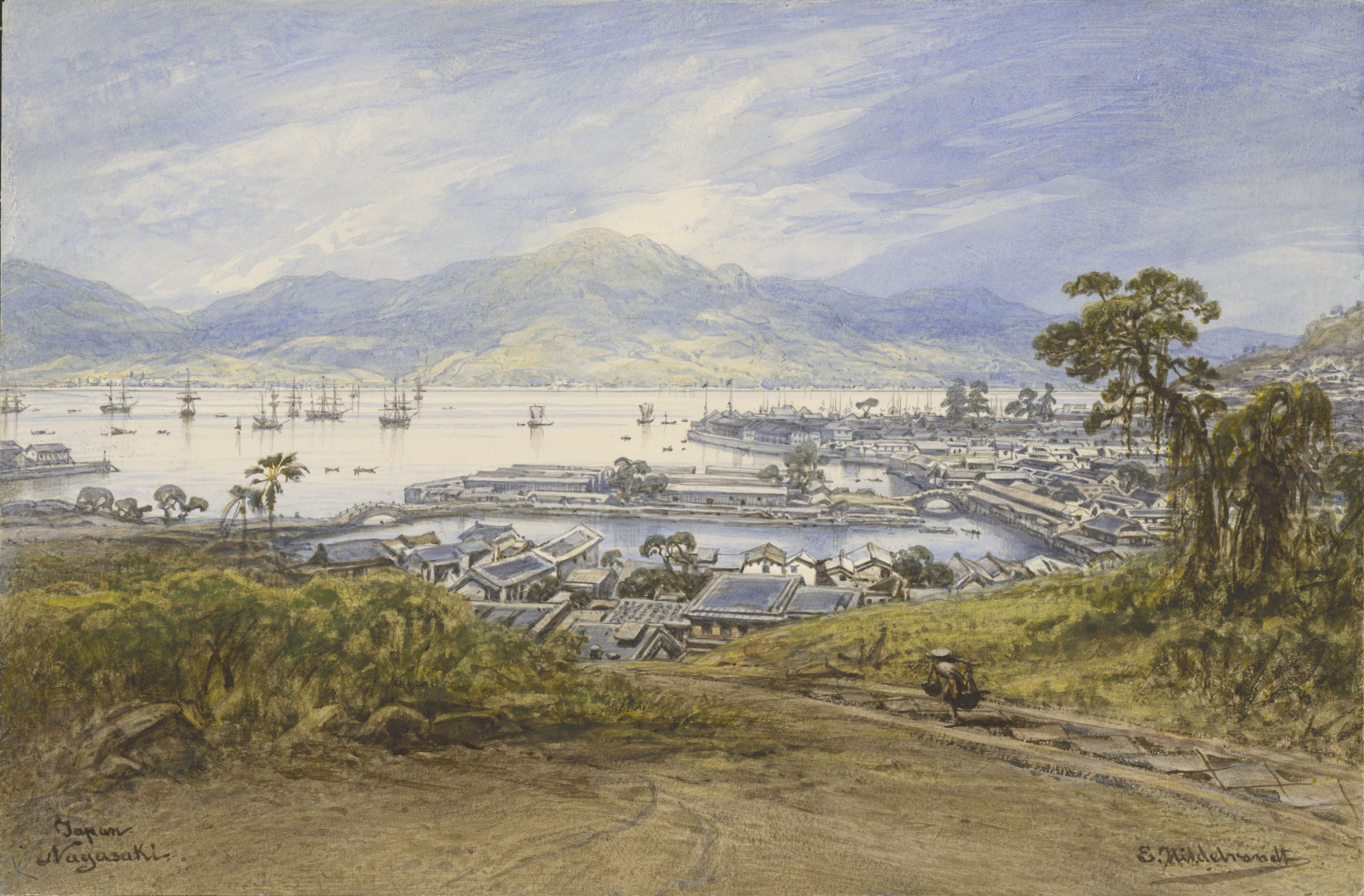
Port of Nagasaki in Japan

Whilst his experience became enlarged his powers of concentration broke down. He lost the taste for detail in seeking for scenic breadth, and a fatal facility of hand diminished the value of his works for all those who look for composition and harmony of hue as necessary concomitants of tone and touch.

In oil he gradually produced less, in water colours more, than at first, and his fame must rest on the sketches which he made in the latter form, many of them represented by chromolithography. Fantasies in red, yellow and opal, sunset, sunrise and moonshine, distances of hundreds of miles like those of the Andes and the Himalaya, narrow streets in the bazaars of Cairo or Suez, panoramas as seen from mast-heads, wide cities like Bombay or Pekin, narrow strips of desert with measure-less expanses of skyall alike display his quality of bravura. Hildebrandt died at Berlin on 25 October 1868.
