= Carl Saltzmann =

German painter

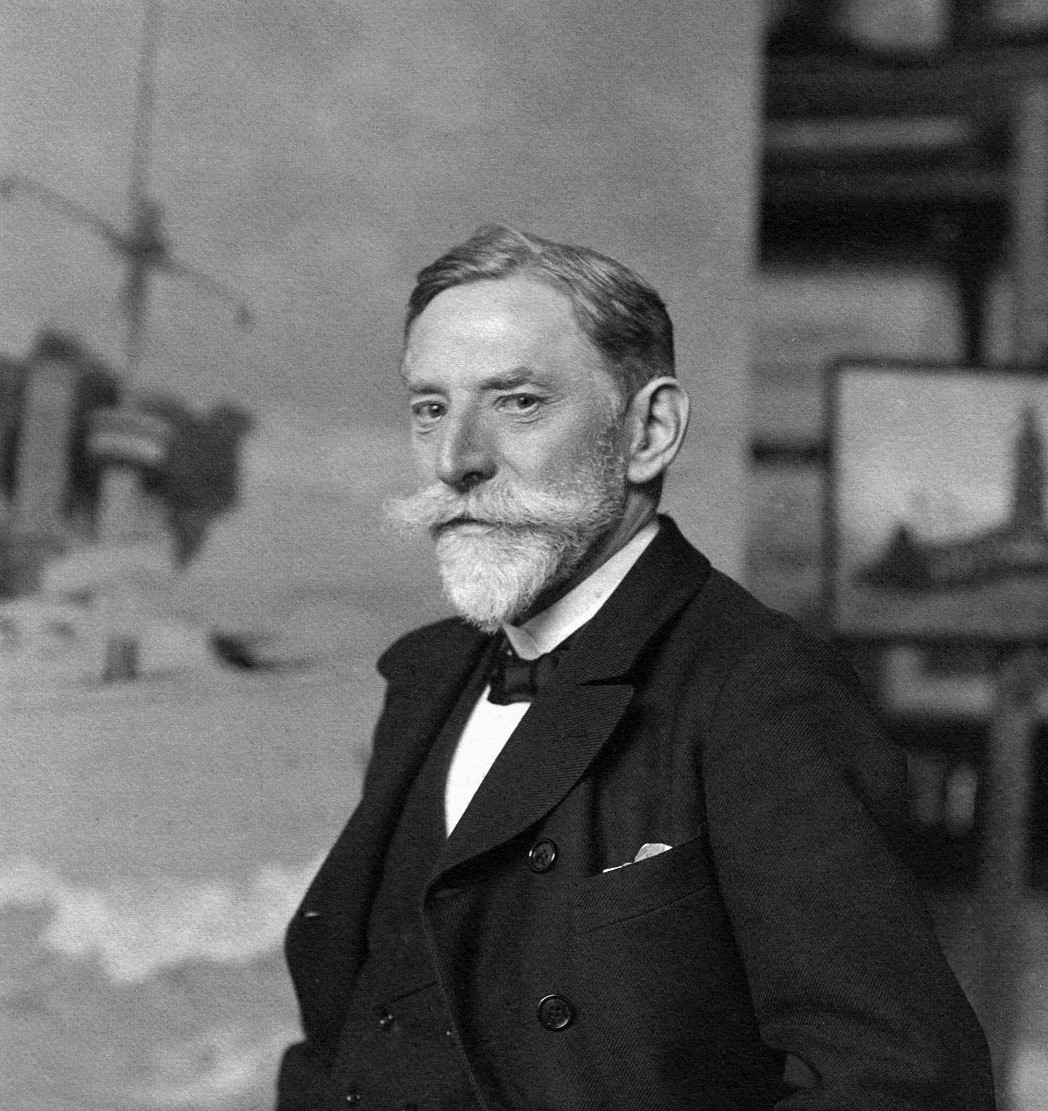
Carl Saltzmann (1908)

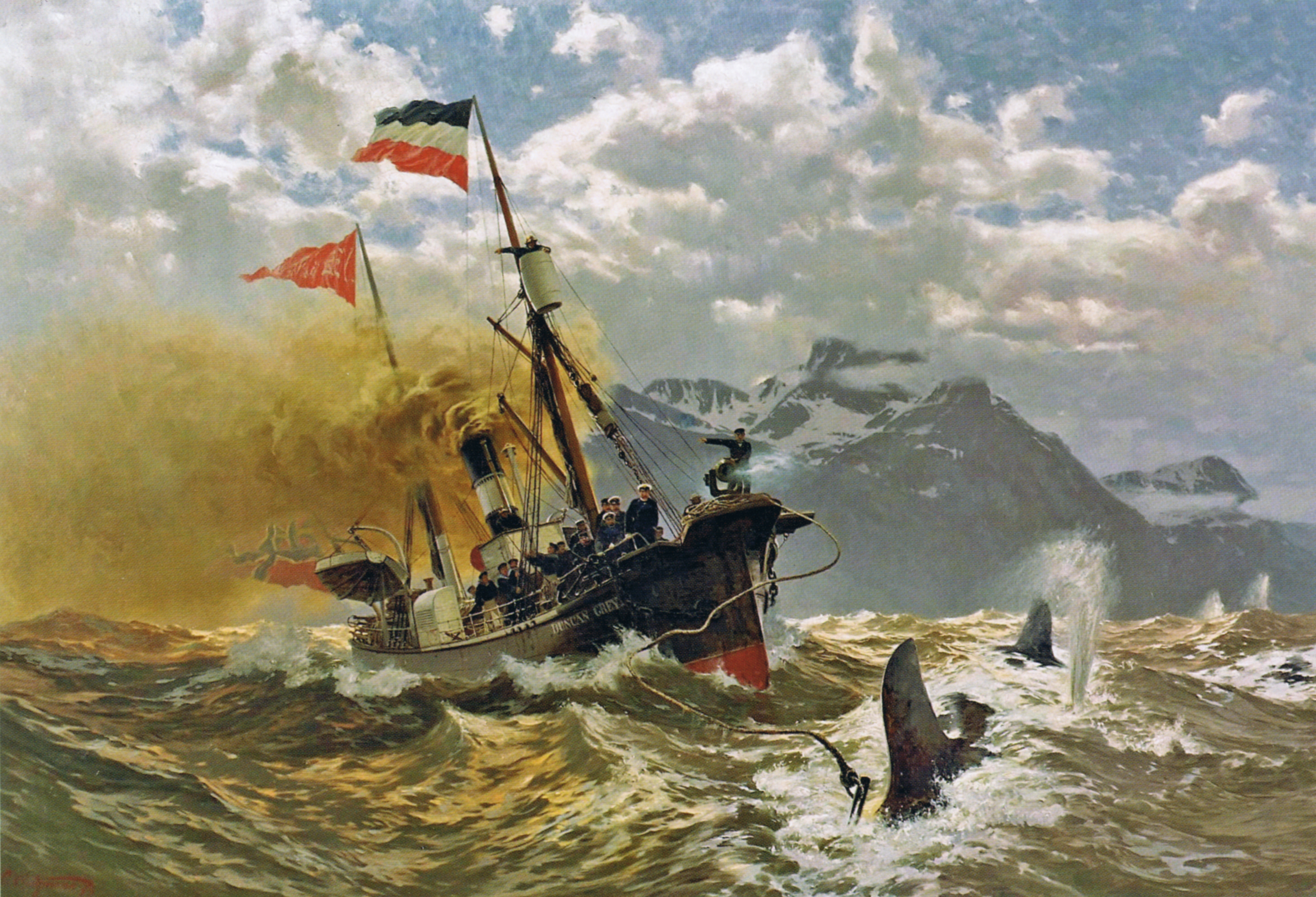
Whaling with the Duncan Grey, 1900

Kaiserin Augusta verlässt Newyork (English: "SMS Kaiserin Augusta leaving New York"); 1895 lithograph from Unsre Kriegsflotte

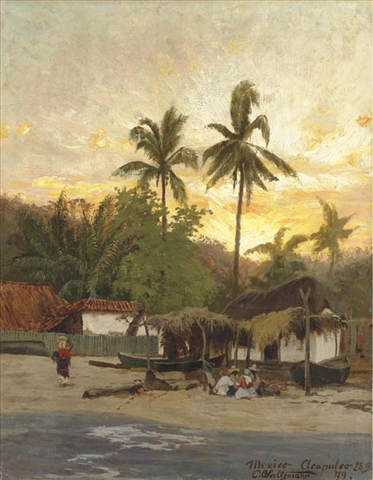
View of Acapulco, 1879

Carl Saltzmann (23 September 1847 – 14 January 1923) was a German marine and landscape painter.

== Biography ==
He was born in Berlin. He was a pupil of Hermann Eschke, then studied at Düsseldorf, and, after traveling through the Netherlands and Italy, settled in Berlin. During 1878–1880 he went with Prince Henry of Prussia on his trip around the world and later accompanied the German Emperor on his visit to St. Petersburg and Norway.

Of his pictures resulting from these journeys may be mentioned "Corvette Prince Adalbert in the Strait of Magellan" (1883, Breslau Museum), "In the Pacific Ocean" (1888, German Emperor), and "Arrival of the Hohenzollern at Kronstadt" (Emperor of Russia). The National Gallery, Berlin, contains two paintings by him. In 1888 Saltzmann was awarded the great gold medal at Berlin and in 1896 he was appointed professor at the Academy.

Saltzmann's painting "Walfang mit der Duncan Grey" (Whaling with the Duncan Grey) depicted the 15 July 1892 "pleasure whaling trip" taken by German Emperor Wilhelm II on the whaling and sealing vessel Duncan Grey, during which a sei whale was harpooned with explosive shells and hauled back to shore.

Saltzmann died in 1923 in Potsdam.
