= Wilhelm Herbig =

German painter and art professor

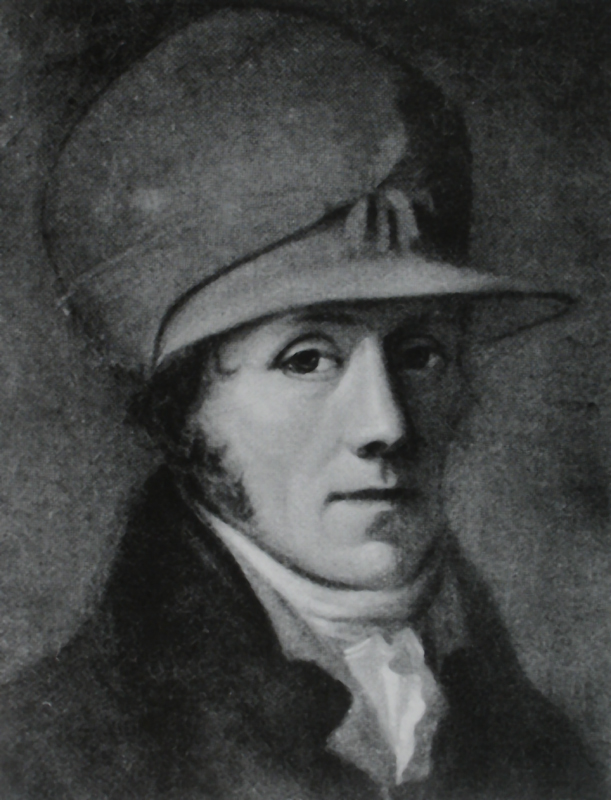
Self-portrait (date unknown)

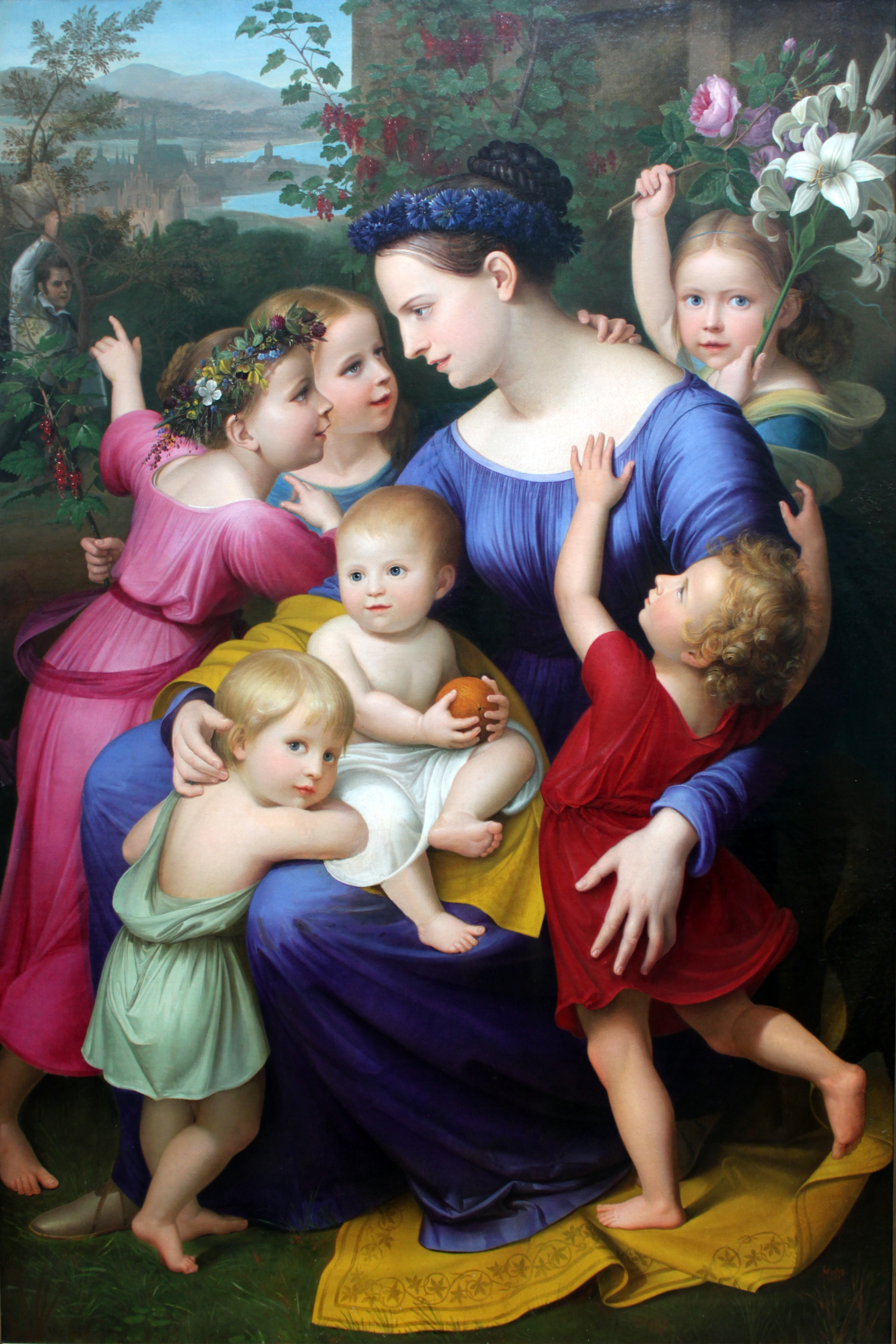
Portrait of his wife and children

Friedrich Wilhelm Heinrich Herbig (22 April 1788 – 5 July 1861) was a German painter and art professor.

== Life and work ==
He was born in Potsdam. His father, Friedrich Herbig (1754–1832), was a cellist who played in a chamber ensemble. His brother, Friedrich August Herbig, would become a publisher. He initially studied with Christoph Franz Hillner (1745–1812), a painter of portraits and religious scenes. Most of his art lessons were, however, provided by his friend, Carl Kolbe, who had begun his artistic training while still a young boy.

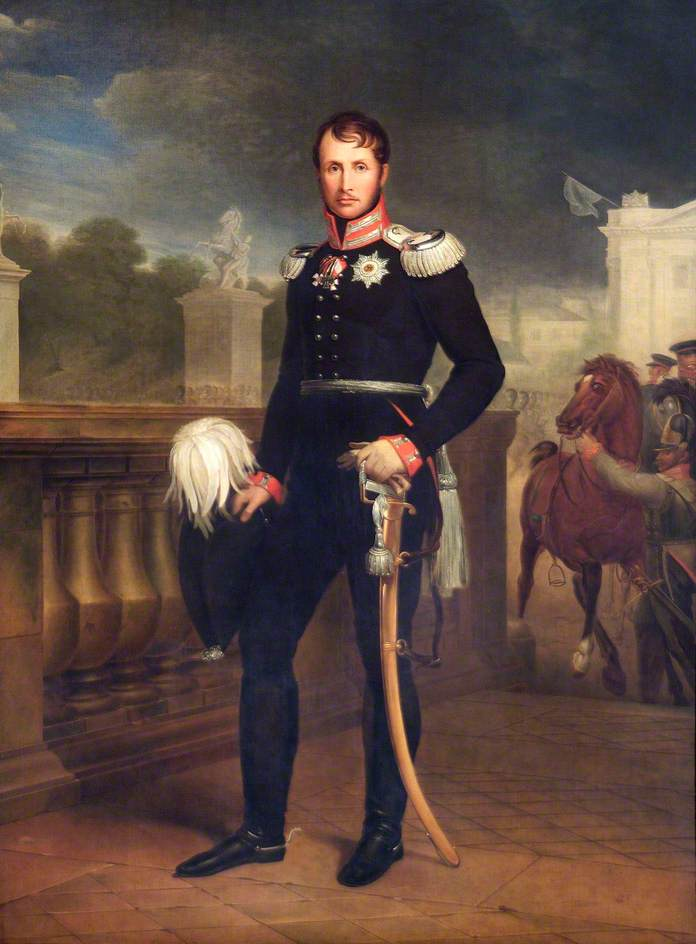
Portrait of Frederick William III of Prussia, 1818

He volunteered as a Jäger in the Napoleonic Wars, and became known for the battle scenes he created. At the Battle of Dresden in 1813, he fell ill and was taken to Prague. Although he recovered, he was left weakened and resigned from the army.

He continued to create paintings with military themes; including portraits of leaders he admired. He also painted genre scenes and works with religious themes. His self-portrait, and a contrasting portrayal of his wife, Henriette (1796–1851), and their six children, are among his most familiar works.

From 1822 until his death, he was a member of the Prussian Academy of Arts. Following the death of Johann Gottfried Schadow in 1850, he was appointed the Academy's Acting Director. He was also a member of the Masonic lodge, "Zum Widder" (To the Ram/Aries). In 1848, he was awarded the Order of the Red Eagle.

He died at the age of seventy-four in Berlin and was interred at the Friedhöfe vor dem Halleschen Tor, next to his wife. In 1969, the site was designated an "Ehrengrab" (grave of honor).
