= Skowronek =

Skowronek ("lark" in Polish), sometimes spelled Skowroneck, may refer to:

- Skowronek, Pomeranian Voivodeship, a village in northern Poland
- Skowronek (surname), people with the last name
- Skowronek (horse), an Arabian stallion
