= Wda, Pomeranian Voivodeship =

Village in Pomeranian Voivodeship, Poland

Wda
- Village
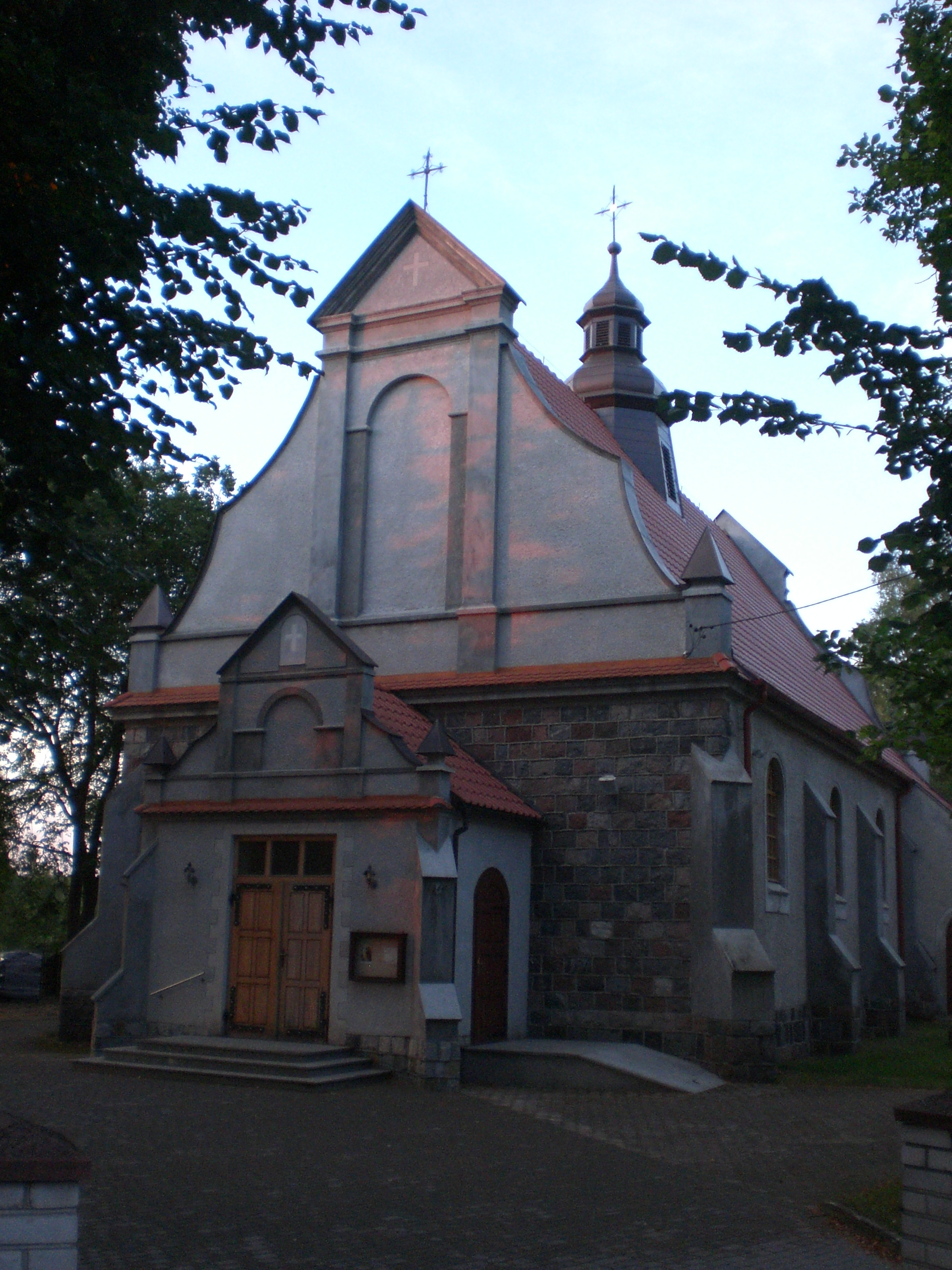
- Sacred Heart church in Wda

- Location within Poland
- Coordinates: 53°47′40″N 18°23′27″E
- Country: Poland
- Voivodeship: Pomeranian
- County: Starogard
- Gmina: Lubichowo
- Elevation: 92 m (302 ft)
- Population: 417
- Time zone: UTC+1 (CET)
  - Summer (DST): UTC+2 (CEST)
- Vehicle registration: GST

Wda [vda] is a village in the administrative district of Gmina Lubichowo, within Starogard County, Pomeranian Voivodeship, in northern Poland. It is located within the ethnocultural region of Kociewie in the historic region of Pomerania.

The settlement Pawelec is part of the village.

Wda was a royal village of the Kingdom of Poland, administratively located in the Tczew County in the Pomeranian Voivodeship.
