= Škorvánek =

Škorvánek (feminine: Škorvánková) is a Slovak surname. Notable people with the surname include:

- Dominika Škorvánková (born 1991), Slovak footballer
- Stanislav Škorvánek (born 1996), Slovak ice hockey player

== See also ==
- Skowronek (surname), a Polish surname
