= Max Koner =

German painter

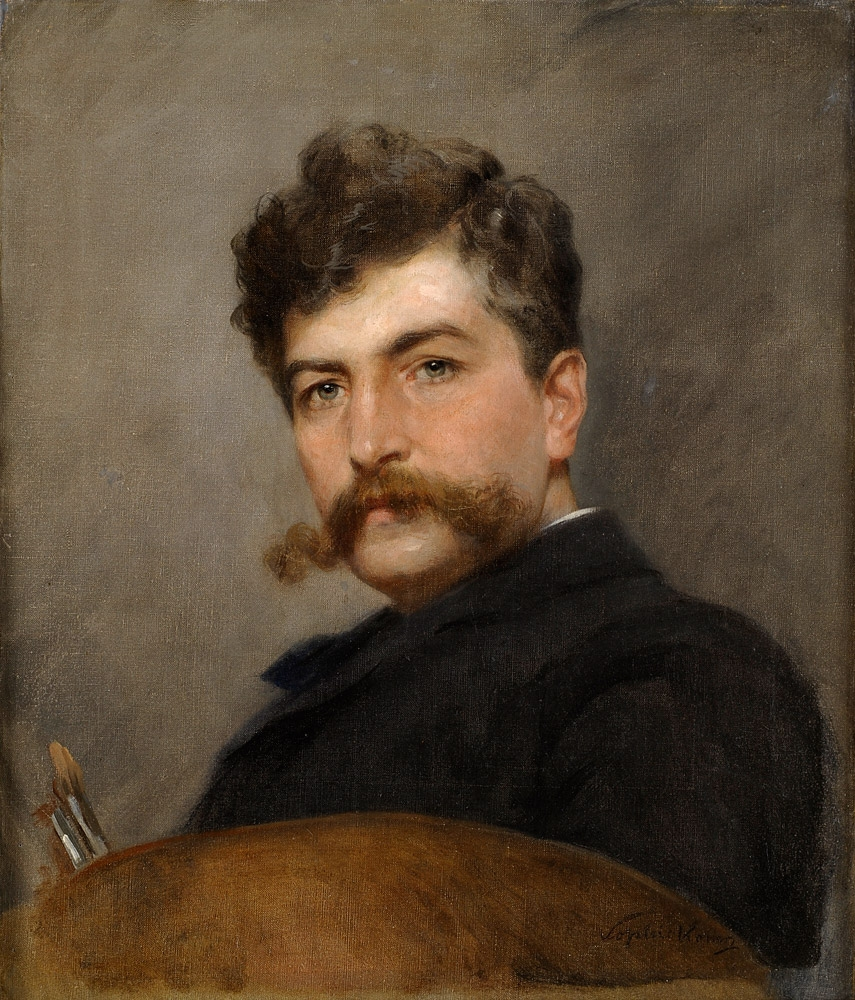
Max Koner; portrait by his wife, Sophie

Max Johann Bernhard Koner (17 July 1854 – 7 July 1900) was a German portraitist.

== Biography ==
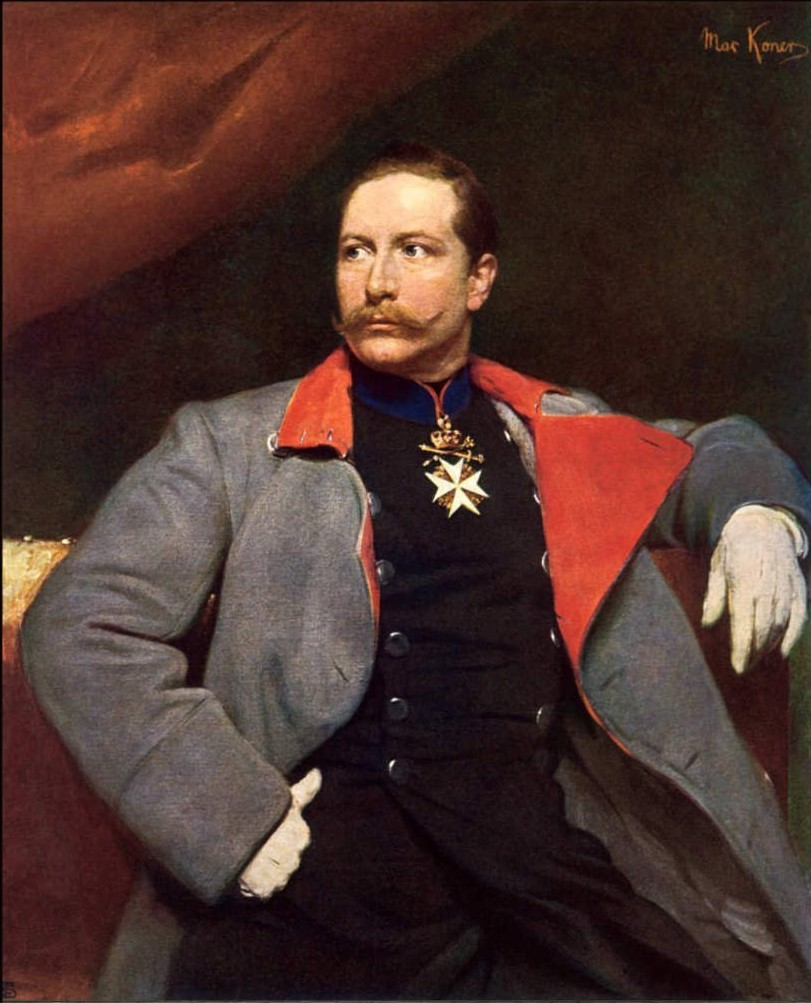
Kaiser Wilhelm II

He was born in Berlin. From 1873 to 1878, he studied at the Prussian Academy of Arts under Eduard Daege, Anton von Werner and others. He spent some time in Italy in 1875 and, after graduating went to study in Paris. In 1893, he became a member of the Academy.

Originally devoted to landscape painting, he switched to figure painting and, finally, to portraits. Between 1888 and his death, he completed over 100 portraits, including thirty of Kaiser Wilhelm II, beginning in 1890, depicting him in various uniforms. In 1894, one of those portraits was awarded a gold medal at the "Große Berliner Kunstausstellung", a prestigious exhibition held from 1893 to 1969.

In 1886, he married one of his students, Sophie Schäffer, who also became a noted portrait painter; primarily of children. His other notable students included Hermann Struck, Clara Siewert and Paul Gerhart Vowe.

For several years, he served as a member of the committee that selected artists for the popular trading cards issued by the Stollwerck chocolate company.

He died in 1900 in Berlin, and was buried at the Friedhöfe vor dem Halleschen Tor. A competition to design his monument there was won by Fritz Klimsch who created a profile of the artist above two women in mourning dress. The monument has not been preserved.

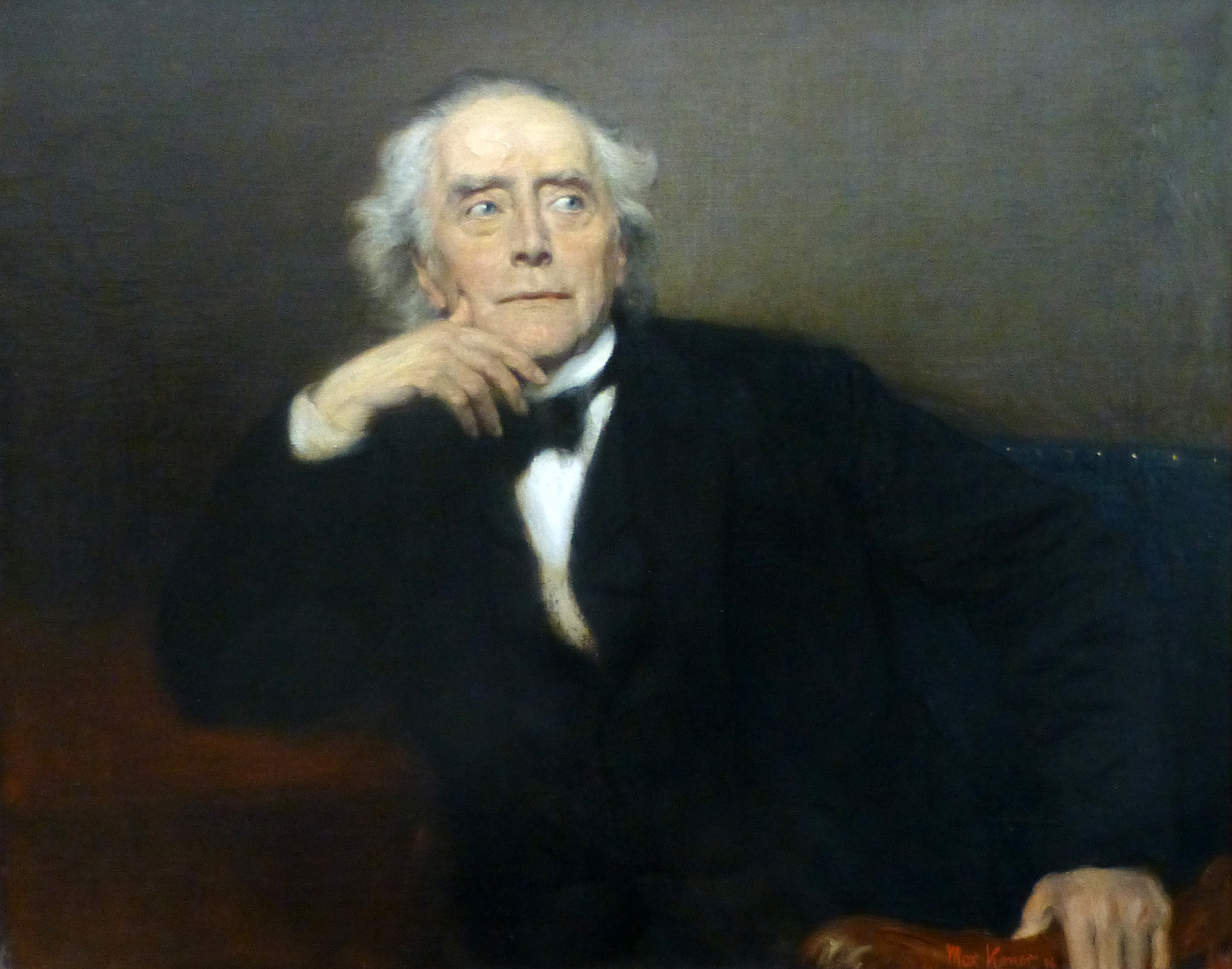
Portrait of Ernst Curtius

Among his most notable portraits may be numbered those of Adolph von Menzel (1890 and 1895), Andreas Achenbach (1890), Emil Du Bois-Reymond (1890), Anton von Werner (1890), Ernst Curtius (1890), Johannes von Miquel (1893), Eugen Bracht (1894), Georg von Kameke (1894) and Herbert von Bismarck (1899)
