= Clara Siewert =

German painter

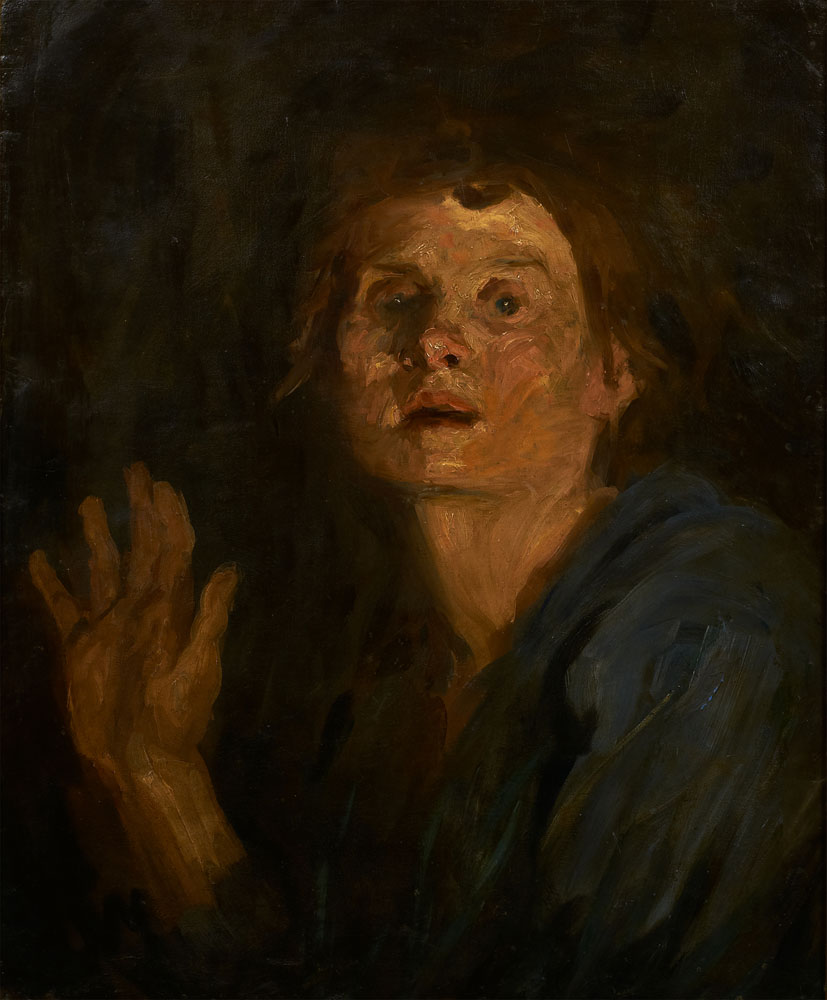
- Self-portrait with raised hand (c. 1895)
- Born: December 9, 1862; Budda, Kreis Preußisch Stargard, West Prussia
- Died: October 11, 1945 (aged 82); Berlin, Allied-occupied Germany
- Style: Symbolism
- Movement: Berlin Secession
- Parents: Ivan Siewert (father); Helene Siewert (née von Baehr) (mother)

Clara Siewert (9 December 1862, Budda (Pomerania) – 11 October 1945, Berlin) was a German Symbolist painter, graphic artist and sculptor; associated with the Berlin Secession.

== Biography ==
She was born to a family of Baltic-Germans who had moved from Saint Petersburg to Danzig after falling out of favor at court. Her father was a retired Prussian Army captain, her mother, Helene (1837–1924), was an amateur artist and her younger sister, Elisabeth Siewert became a popular novelist.

She began drawing as a young girl; inspired by the magical themes of the fairy tales she and her friends acted out. Later, she would sketch from nature. After graduating from a women's college, she went to Königsberg in 1878 for professional lessons, but the Kunstakademie did not accept female students at that time, so she took private lessons with some local artists.

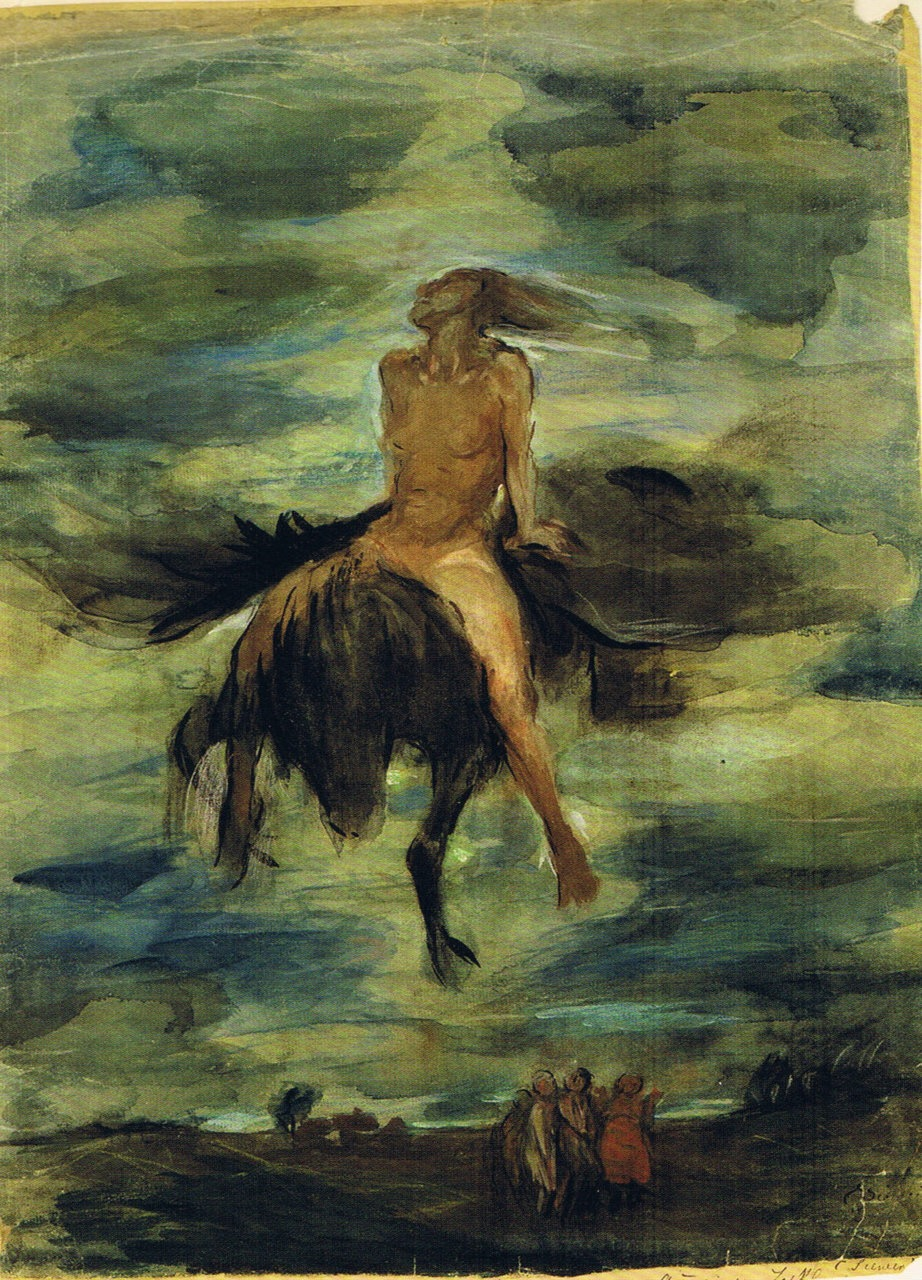
The Apotheosis of a Witch (A Witch on Pegasus)

In 1884, she began to divide her time between Budda and Berlin and was finally able to secure lessons from a notable painter, the Swiss portraitist, Karl Stauffer-Bern, who introduced her to the work of the Symbolist, Arnold Böcklin; a major influence on her style. This was followed by lessons from Max Koner, known as the "Kaisermaler", who ran a famous studio for female artists. She completed her studies around 1888/89 with Hugo Vogel.

In 1892, she began to exhibit in the Berlin salons and became associated with the "Verein der Berliner Künstlerinnen", a group of female artists. Sometime in the late 1890s, she settled permanently in Berlin. She took a semi-detached house and set up a studio there, near a studio that was frequented by members of the Expressionist group, Die Brücke. In 1901, she started to exhibit with the Berlin Secession. She was also associated with the Deutscher Künstlerbund.

=== Career setbacks ===
For reasons that are unclear, she broke with the Secession in 1912, an act which brought her career to a virtual standstill. Between then and 1936, she was represented at only one large exhibition in 1914 in Leipzig. Her friend, Käthe Kollwitz, who was a member of the Secession's selection jury, tried to get some of her works accepted in 1916, but was unsuccessful.

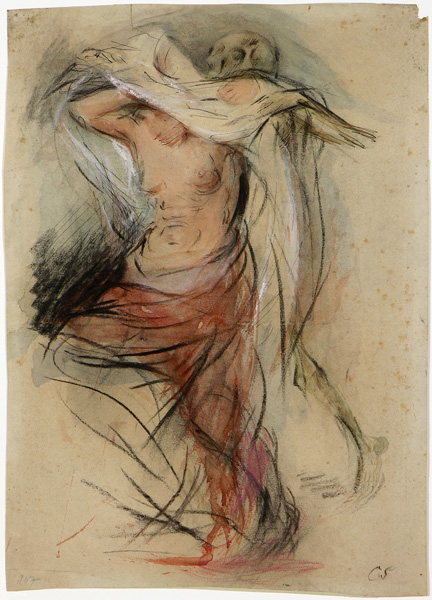
Death and the Maiden

She was helped through this period by her sisters, especially Elisabeth, who was making a good living from her writing. When Elisabeth died in 1930, Clara became severely depressed and, within a few years, was destitute. As a last resort, she applied to the newly created Reich Ministry of Public Enlightenment and Propaganda for financial support, and it was granted. She later became a member of the Reichskulturkammer, but never joined the Nazi Party.

In 1936, the gallery owner Wolfgang Gurlitt became aware of her and organized the largest exhibition of her works during her lifetime (174 pieces) but it was not a critical success. A planned follow-up exhibition was cancelled due to the start of World War II. In 1943, her home and studio were destroyed by a bombing raid and she sought refuge with a neighbor. A large part of her work was destroyed at that time.

By then, she was no longer receiving her annual pension from the Ministry and was soon living in poverty. For many years, it was believed that she was killed during a bombing raid in 1944, but a letter from her sister Victoria, published in 2012, indicates that she died shortly after the end of the war from a heart ailment.

She was largely forgotten until 2008, when a major retrospective was presented at the Kunstforum Ostdeutsche Galerie in Regensburg, titled "Clara Siewert - Between Dream and Reality". Most of her approximately 170 known surviving works, in various media, are now displayed there.

== Sources ==
- Roman Zieglgänsberger, Clara Siewert. Zwischen Traum und Wirklichkeit., (exhibition catalog), Kunstforum Ostdeutsche Galerie, 2008, ISBN 978-3-89188-116-3
- Clara Siewert. In: Thieme-Becker: Allgemeines Lexikon der Bildenden Künstler von der Antike bis zur Gegenwart. Vol.31, E. A. Seemann, Leipzig 1937
