= Zielona Góra, Pomeranian Voivodeship =

Village in Pomeranian Voivodeship, Poland

Zielona Góra
- Village
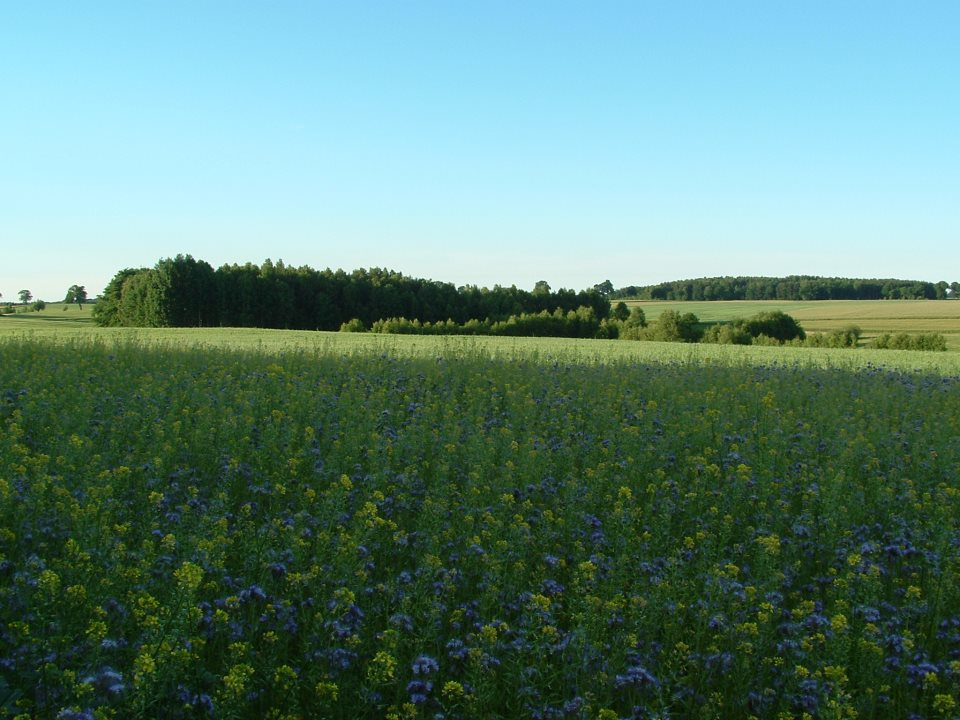
- Landscape in Zielona Góra

- Location within Poland
- Coordinates: 53°52′34″N 18°27′49″E
- Country: Poland
- Voivodeship: Pomeranian
- County: Starogard
- Gmina: Lubichowo
- Population: 214
- Time zone: UTC+1 (CET)
  - Summer (DST): UTC+2 (CEST)
- Vehicle registration: GST

Zielona Góra (Polish: [ʑɛˈlɔna ˈɡura]) is a village in the administrative district of Gmina Lubichowo, within Starogard County, Pomeranian Voivodeship, in northern Poland. It is located within the ethnocultural region of Kociewie in the historic region of Pomerania.

== History ==
Zielona Góra was a royal village of the Kingdom of Poland, administratively located in the Tczew County in the Pomeranian Voivodeship.

During the German occupation of Poland (World War II), in 1942, several Poles from Zielona Góra were expelled to the General Government, and their farms were handed over to German colonists as part of the Lebensraum policy.
