= Budy, Starogard County =

Village in Pomeranian Voivodeship, Poland

Budy
- Village
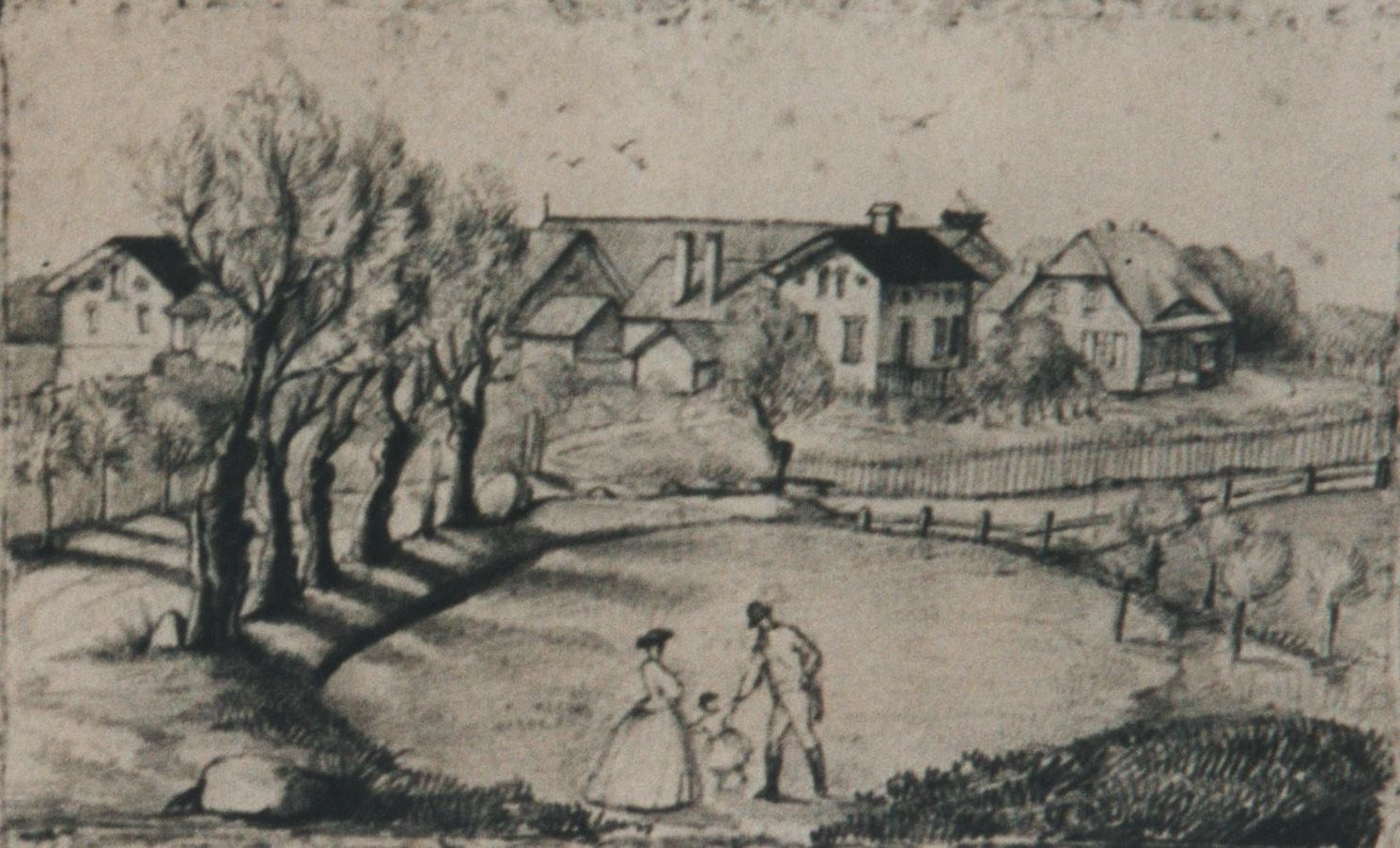
- Detail of a painting by Helene Siewert showing the manor house at Budy, 1863

- Location within Poland
- Coordinates: 53°52′35″N 18°27′5″E
- Country: Poland
- Voivodeship: Pomeranian
- County: Starogard
- Gmina: Lubichowo

Population
  - Total: 27
- Time zone: UTC+1 (CET)
  - Summer (DST): UTC+2 (CEST)
- Vehicle registration: GST

Budy [ˈbudɨ] is a village in the administrative district of Gmina Lubichowo, within Starogard County, Pomeranian Voivodeship, in northern Poland. It is located in the ethnocultural region of Kociewie in the historic region of Pomerania.

== Notable residents ==
- Clara Siewert (1862–1945), German artist
