= Baby, Pomeranian Voivodeship =

Settlement in Kociewie

Baby Baby Leśniczówka
- Hamlet
- Location within Poland
- Coordinates: 53°50′24″N 18°37′07″E
- Country: Poland
- Voivodeship: Pomeranian
- County: Starogard
- Gmina: Lubichowo
- Time zone: UTC+1 (CET)
  - Summer (DST): UTC+2 (CEST)
- Postal code: 83-240
- SIMC: 0166670
- Vehicle registration: GTC

Baby [ˈbabɨ] (Kocievian: Baby Leśniczówka) is a hamlet in the administrative district of Gmina Lubichowo, within Starogard County, Pomeranian Voivodeship, in northern Poland. It is located in the ethnocultural region of Kociewie.
