= Młynki, Starogard County =

Village in Pomeranian Voivodeship, Poland

Młynki
- Settlement
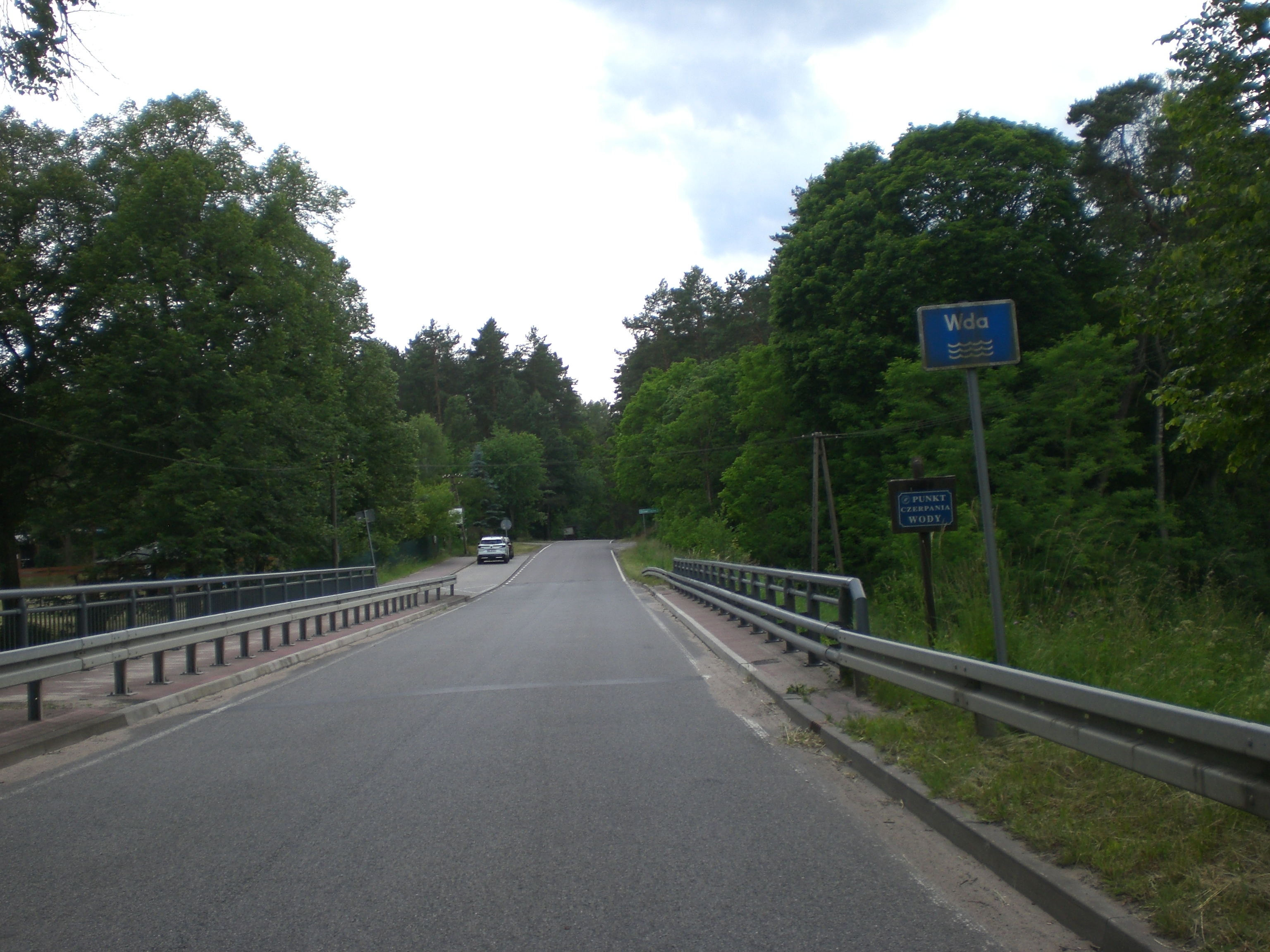

- Location within Poland
- Coordinates: 53°50′40″N 18°21′24″E
- Country: Poland
- Voivodeship: Pomeranian
- County: Starogard
- Gmina: Lubichowo
- Time zone: UTC+1 (CET)
  - Summer (DST): UTC+2 (CEST)
- Vehicle registration: GST

Młynki [ˈmwɨnki] is a settlement in the administrative district of Gmina Lubichowo, within Starogard County, Pomeranian Voivodeship, in northern Poland. It is located within the ethnocultural region of Kociewie in the historic region of Pomerania.
