= August von Brandis =

German painter

- Born: 12 May 1859; Berlin, Kingdom of Prussia, German Empire
- Died: 19 October 1947 (aged 88); Aachen, North Rhine-Westphalia, West Germany
- Resting place: Aachen, North Rhine-Westphalia, West Germany
- Known for: Painting
- Movement: Impressionism
- Spouse: Bertha von der Kuhlen (m. 1876)
- Awards: Gold Medal for Art by the Emperor Wilhelm II, Gold Medal of the Glaspalast Exhibition in Munich
- Elected: Dean of the RWTH Aachen

August Friedrich Carl von Brandis (12 May 1859 – 18 October 1947) was a German impressionist painter, best known for his interiors. He painted Aachen Cathedral in several works.

== Biography ==
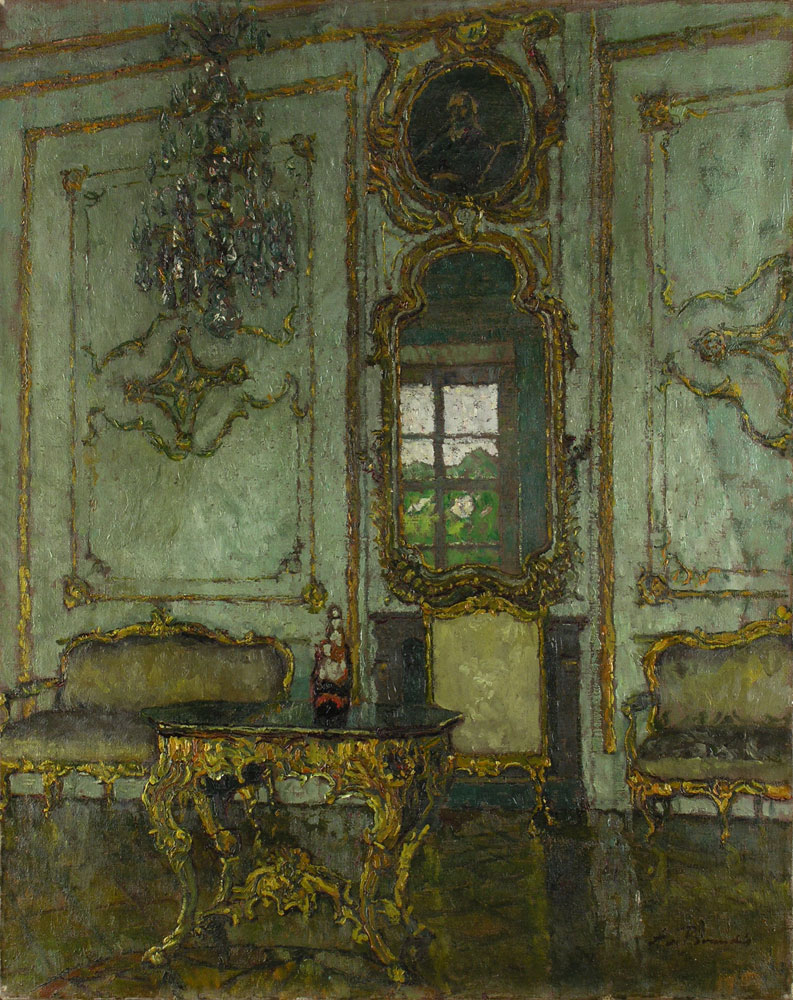
Rokoko-room in the Würzburg residence

August von Brandis came from the old noble family of Brandis from Alfeld an der Leine. He was born in Berlin-Haselhorst. He attended the Prussian Academy of Arts in Berlin where he was taught by Hugo Vogel and Anton von Werner.

From 1884 he taught art at the Technical University of Gdansk, where he became a professor in 1904. Brandis worked together with Adolf Hölzel at his painting school "Neu-Dachau" and was a member of the Künstlerkolonie Dachau (artists’ colony of Dachau). Originally being an artist of historism in Dachau Brandis changed his style to impressionism. He received in 1910 and 1911 Gold Medal for Art by the Emperor Wilhelm II. at the Great Berlin Art Exhibition and 1911, and the Gold Medal of the Art Exhibition in Munich.

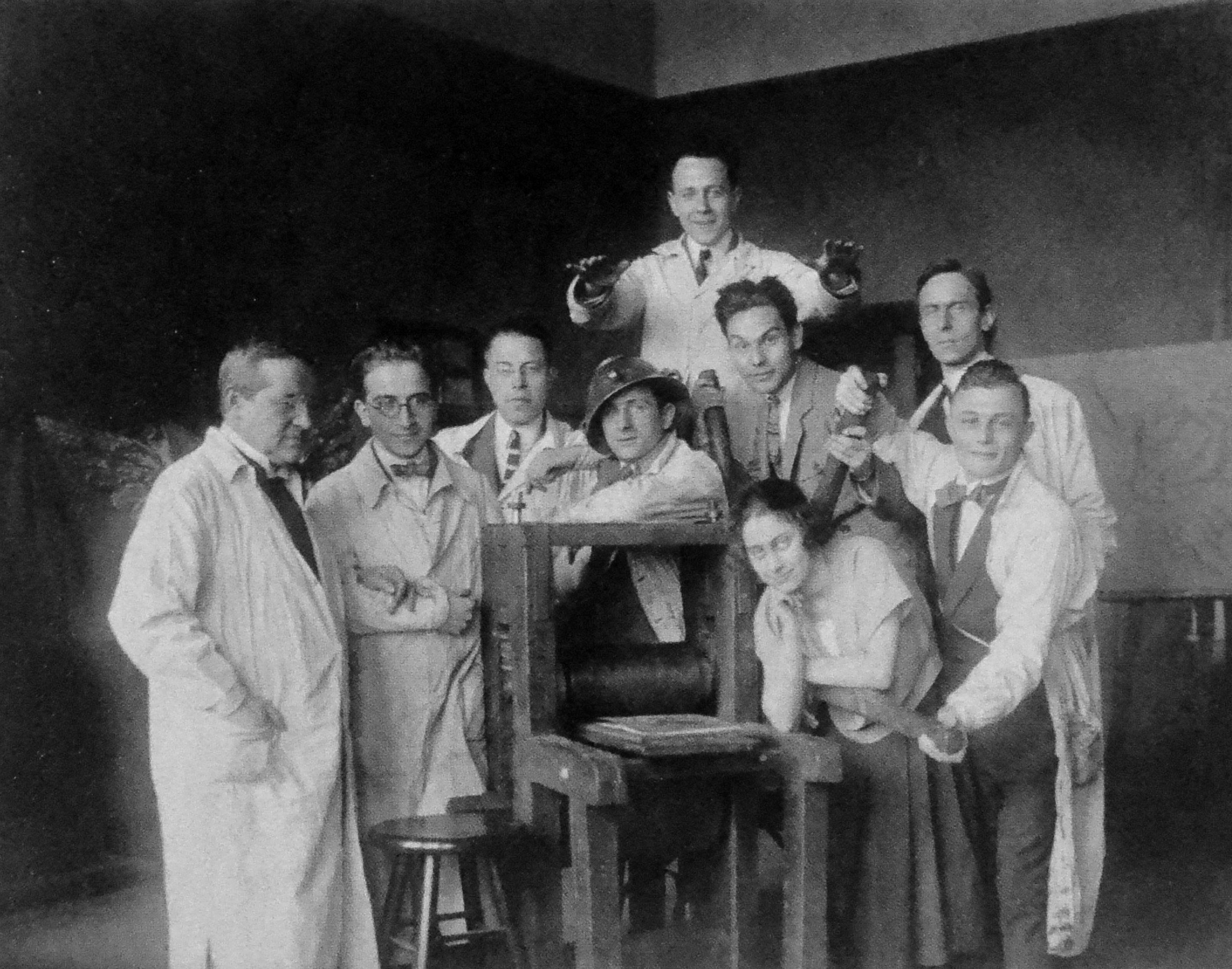
August von Brandis with students in Aachen

In 1909, he succeeded Alexander Frenz at the Faculty of Architecture of the RWTH Aachen as a full "professor of figure and landscape painting", and became dean in 1929. In Aachen Brandis had his most successful and creative years. In Kaldenkirchen his parents-in-law had a house with a large garden, August von Brandis spent many time in the Rokoko pavilion.

He died in 1947 in Aachen and was interred at the Waldfriedhof.
