= Mermet =

Village in Pomeranian Voivodeship, Poland

- Village
- Location within Poland
- Coordinates: 53°47′9″N 18°20′41″E
- Country: Poland
- Voivodeship: Pomeranian
- County: Starogard
- Gmina: Lubichowo
- Elevation: 100 m (330 ft)
- Population: 41
- Time zone: UTC+1 (CET)
  - Summer (DST): UTC+2 (CEST)
- Vehicle registration: GST

Mermet [ˈmɛrmɛt] is a village in the administrative district of Gmina Lubichowo, within Starogard County, Pomeranian Voivodeship, in northern Poland. It is located within the ethnocultural region of Kociewie in the historic region of Pomerania.
