= Smolniki, Starogard County =

Village in Pomeranian Voivodeship, Poland

Smolniki
- Village
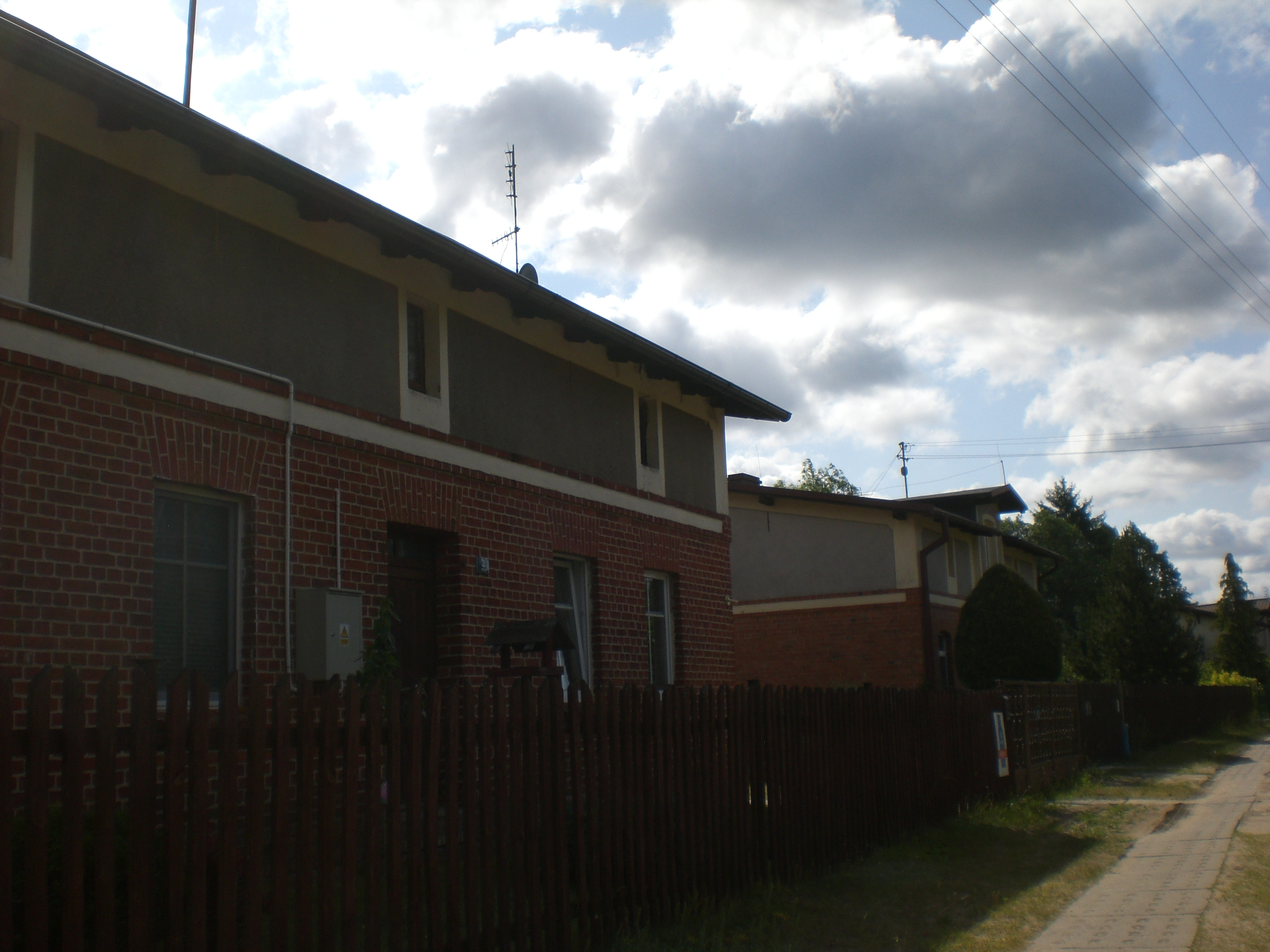
- Smolniki

- Location within Poland
- Coordinates: 53°46′12″N 18°25′25″E
- Country: Poland
- Voivodeship: Pomeranian
- County: Starogard
- Gmina: Lubichowo

Population
  - Total: 42
- Time zone: UTC+1 (CET)
  - Summer (DST): UTC+2 (CEST)
- Vehicle registration: GST

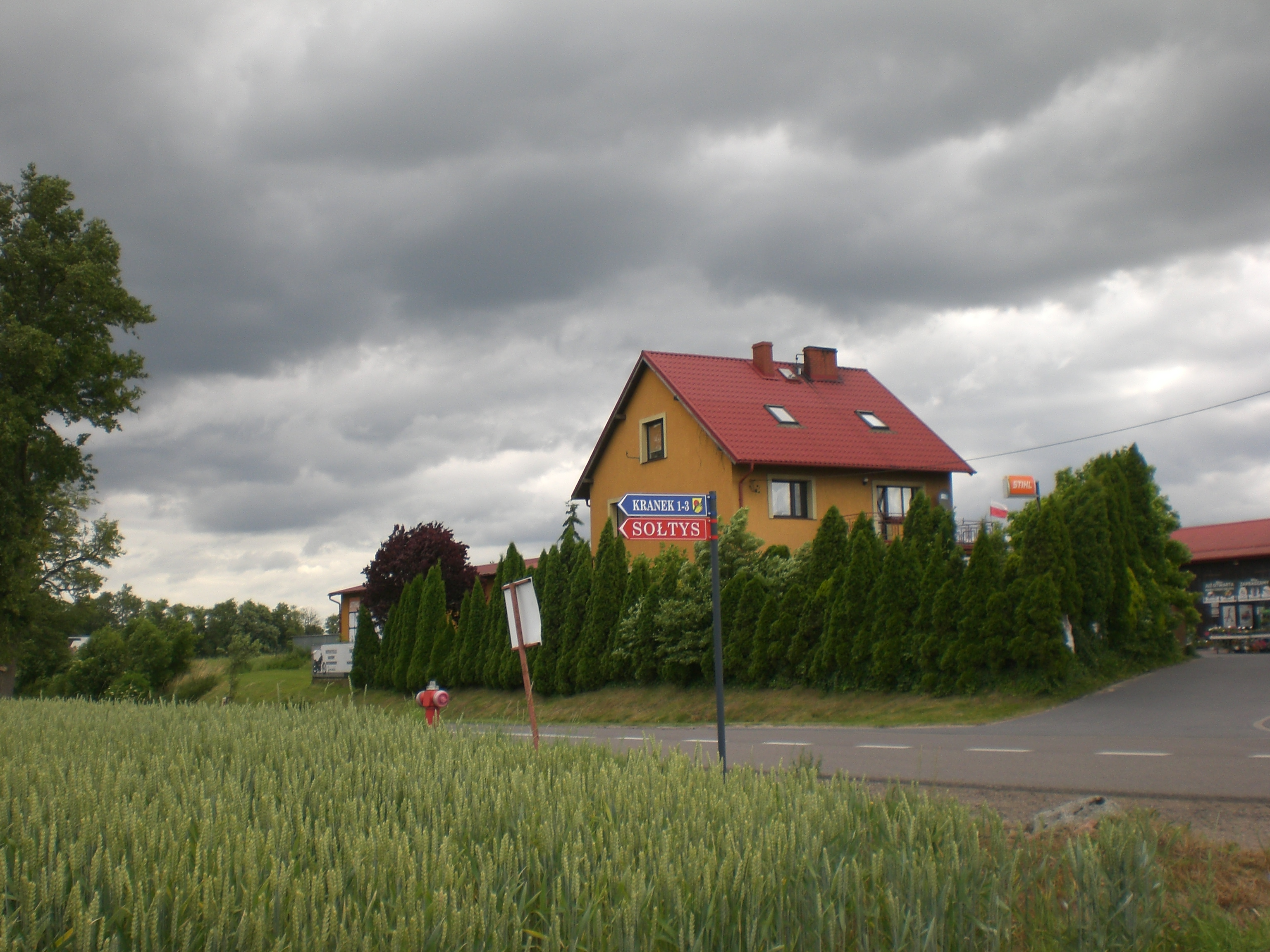
Kranek 1116

Smolniki [smɔlˈniki] is a village in the administrative district of Gmina Lubichowo, within Starogard County, Pomeranian Voivodeship, in northern Poland. It is located in the ethnocultural region of Kociewie in the historic region of Pomerania.
