= Wdecki Młyn =

Village in Pomeranian Voivodeship, Poland

- Settlement
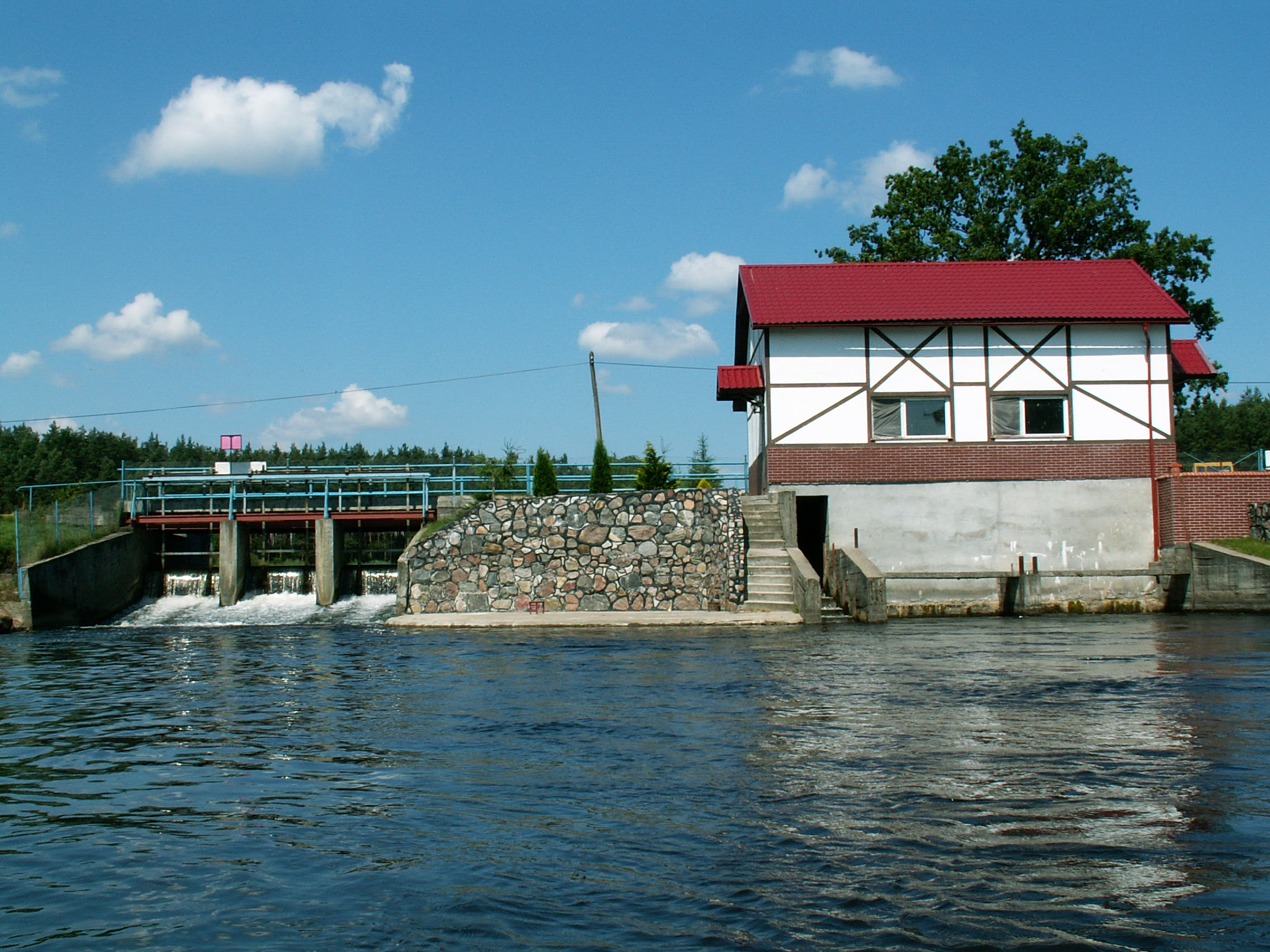
- The hydro-electric power station at Wdecki Młyn

- Location within Poland
- Coordinates: 53°46′55″N 18°23′43″E
- Country: Poland
- Voivodeship: Pomeranian
- County: Starogard
- Gmina: Lubichowo

Population
  - Total: 21
- Time zone: UTC+1 (CET)
  - Summer (DST): UTC+2 (CEST)
- Vehicle registration: GST

Wdecki Młyn [ˈvdɛt͡ski ˈmwɨn] is a settlement in the administrative district of Gmina Lubichowo, within Starogard County, Pomeranian Voivodeship, in northern Poland. It is located in the ethnocultural region of Kociewie in the historic region of Pomerania.
