= Mościska, Pomeranian Voivodeship =

Village in Pomeranian Voivodeship, Poland

Mościska
- Village
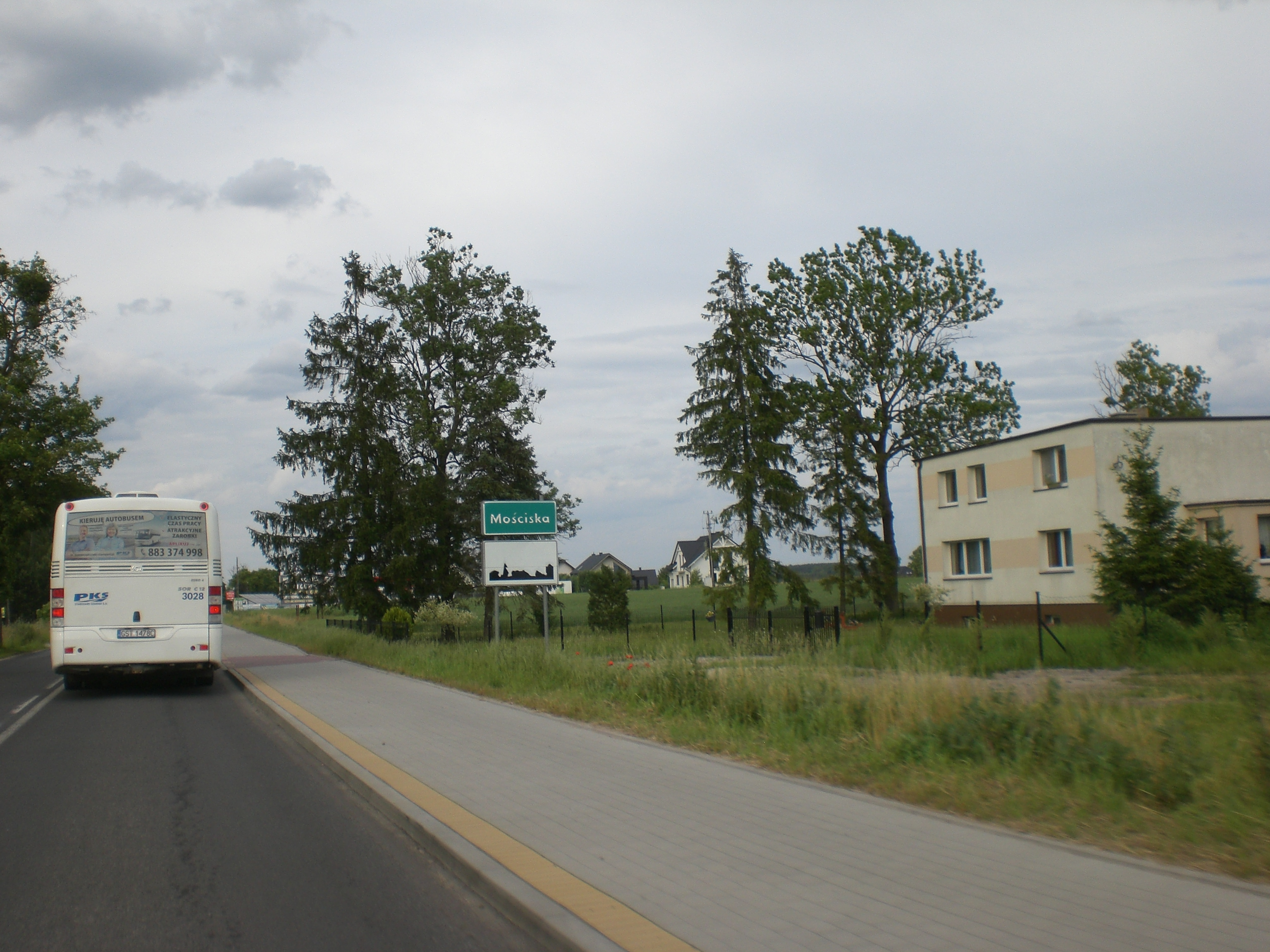

- Location within Poland
- Coordinates: 53°51′50″N 18°26′27″E
- Country: Poland
- Voivodeship: Pomeranian
- County: Starogard
- Gmina: Lubichowo
- Population: 153
- Time zone: UTC+1 (CET)
  - Summer (DST): UTC+2 (CEST)
- Vehicle registration: GST

Mościska [mɔɕˈt͡ɕiska] is a village in the administrative district of Gmina Lubichowo, within Starogard County, Pomeranian Voivodeship, in northern Poland. It is located within the ethnocultural region of Kociewie in the historic region of Pomerania.
