= Wilcze Błota =

Village in Pomeranian Voivodeship, Poland

- Village
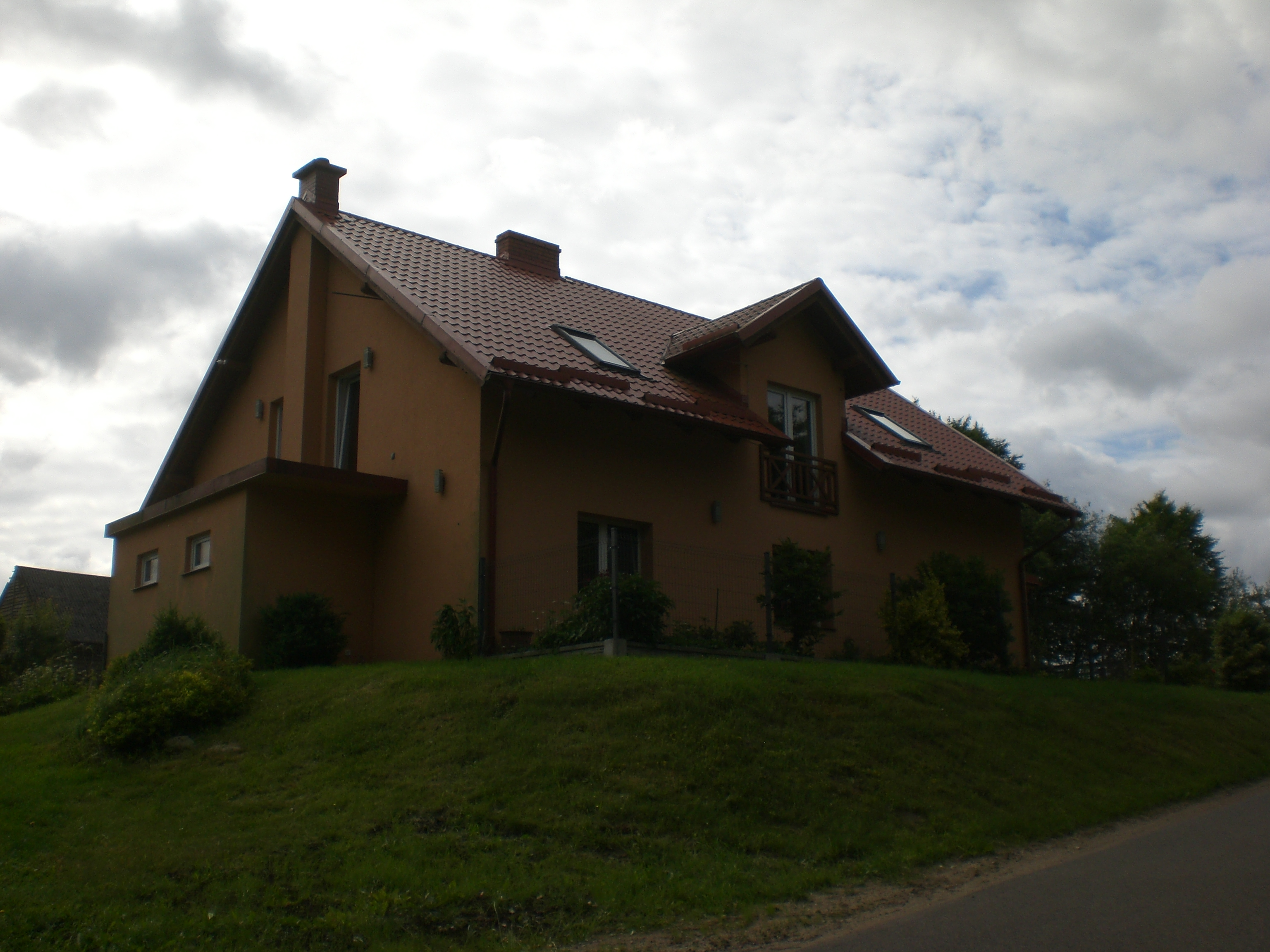

- Location within Poland
- Coordinates: 53°49′25″N 18°23′43″E
- Country: Poland
- Voivodeship: Pomeranian
- County: Starogard
- Gmina: Lubichowo

Population
  - Total: 112
- Time zone: UTC+1 (CET)
  - Summer (DST): UTC+2 (CEST)
- Vehicle registration: GST

Wilcze Błota [ˈvilt͡ʂɛ ˈbwɔta] is a village in the administrative district of Gmina Lubichowo, within Starogard County, Pomeranian Voivodeship, in northern Poland. It is located in the ethnocultural region of Kociewie in the historic region of Pomerania.
