= Szlaga =

Settlement in Kociewie

- Hamlet
- Location within Poland
- Coordinates: 53°50′24″N 18°37′07″E
- Country: Poland
- Voivodeship: Pomeranian
- County: Starogard
- Gmina: Lubichowo
- Time zone: UTC+1 (CET)
  - Summer (DST): UTC+2 (CEST)
- Postal code: 83-221
- SIMC: 0166723
- Vehicle registration: GTC

Szlaga [ˈʂlaɡa] is a hamlet in the administrative district of Gmina Lubichowo, within Starogard County, Pomeranian Voivodeship, in northern Poland. It is located in the ethnocultural region of Kociewie.
