= Hugo Vogel (painter) =

German painter (1855–1934)

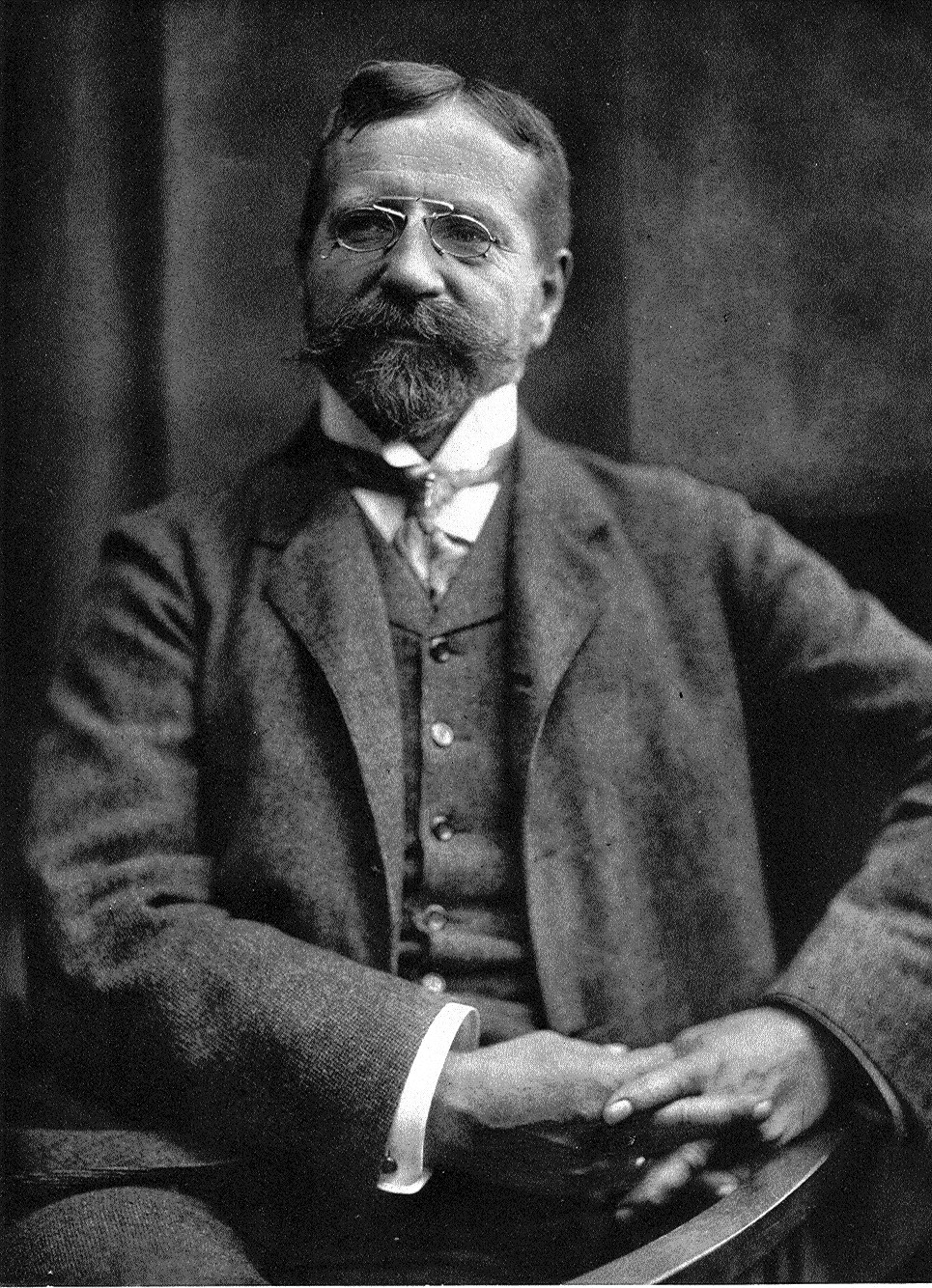
- Vogel in 1905, photograph by Rudolf Dührkoop
- Born: Hugo Vogel; 15 February 1855; Magdeburg, Kingdom of Prussia
- Died: 26 September 1934 (aged 79); Berlin, Germany
- Education: Kunstakademie Düsseldorf
- Known for: Historical scenes and portrait painting
- Notable work: Martin Luther Preaching in Wartburg Castle (c. 1883)
- Movement: Vereinigung der XI; precursor to the Berlin Secession
- Awards: Gold medal, Große Berliner Kunstausstellung (1900)

Hugo Vogel (15 February 1855 – 26 September 1934) was a German painter, known primarily for historical scenes and portraits.

== Early life and education ==
Vogel was born 15 February 1855 in Magdeburg.

His father was a merchant. After graduating from the Realschule in Magdeburg in 1874, he entered the Kunstakademie Düsseldorf, where he studied with Wilhelm Sohn and Eduard von Gebhardt among others. He completed his courses there in 1880 and, three years later, exhibited several historical paintings at the Prussian Academy of Arts.

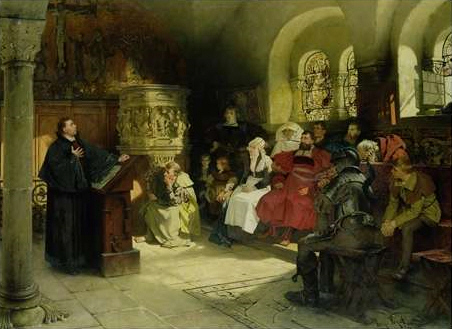
Martin Luther Preaching in Wartburg Castle

== Career ==
In 1886, following an extended visit to Italy, he settled in Berlin. The following year, he was given a professorship at the academy, a position he held until 1892, when he lost it as a result of the "Munch Affair". This involved an exhibit by the Norwegian artist Edvard Munch that was closed by the academy's conservative Director, Anton von Werner. In protest, Vogel and several other painters joined to create the "Vereinigung der XI", a precursor to the Berlin Secession. Among his notable students during his tenure were August von Brandis and Clara Siewert.

In 1893, he went to Paris to study with Jules Lefebvre. After that, he travelled throughout Spain, North Africa, Italy and the Low Countries. In 1900, he was awarded a gold medal at the "Große Berliner Kunstausstellung", a prestigious art exhibition held from 1893 to 1969.

In addition to his canvases, he created frescoes with historical themes in several town halls; notably in Berlin, Hamburg and Merseburg. In 1902, the fresco in Merseburg, Der deutsche Michael, became the subject of plagiarism accusations when the magazine, Der Kunstwart, pointed out its resemblance to an equestrian statue by Paul Dubois, depicting Joan of Arc.

From 1915 to 1917, during World War I, he accompanied Paul von Hindenburg to the Eastern Front as his official portrait painter.

== Death and legacy ==
He died in Berlin 26 September 1934. He is buried at Wannsee Cemetery.

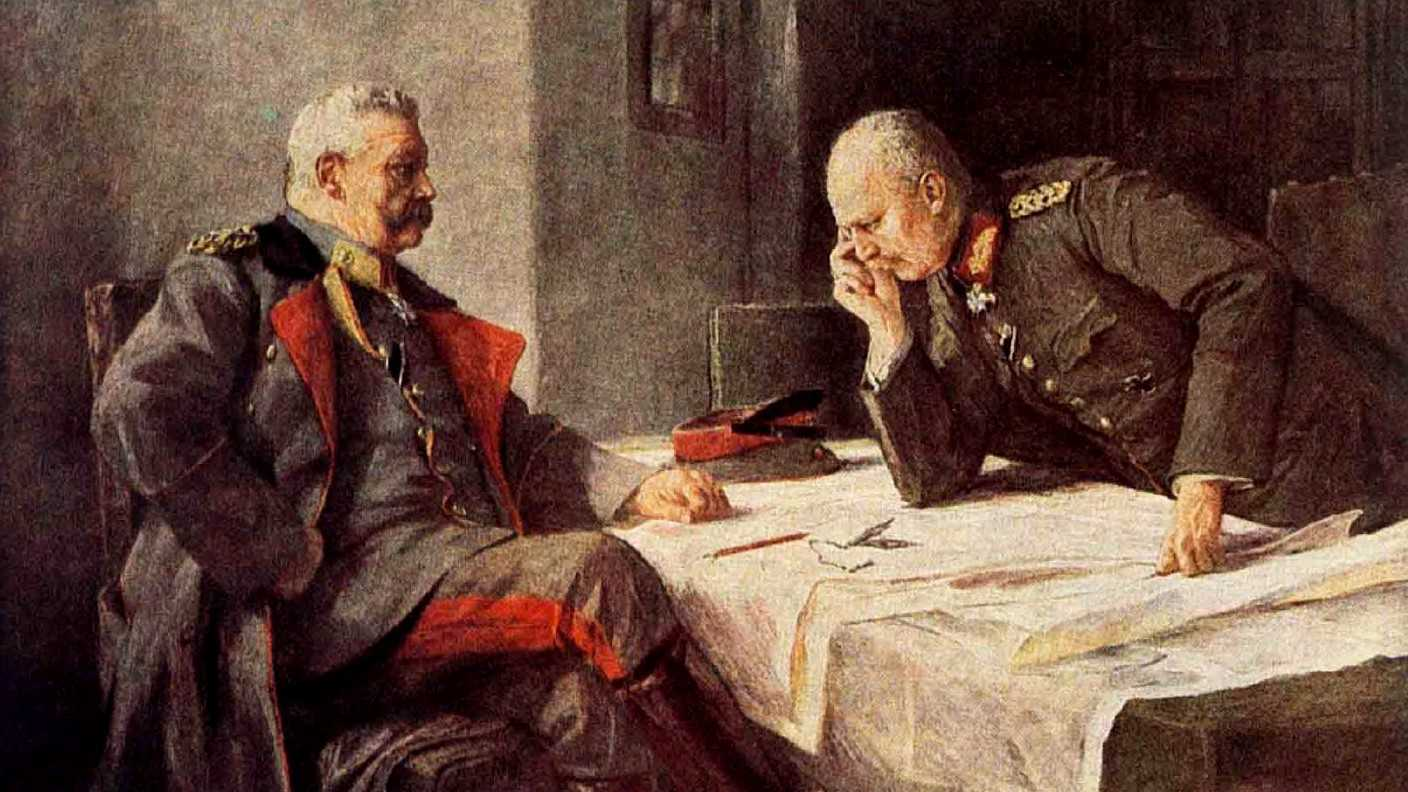
Hindenburg (left) and Erich Ludendorff (detail)

Streets in Magdeburg and Berlin have been named in his honor.
