= Lubichowo =

Village in Pomeranian Voivodeship, Poland

- Village
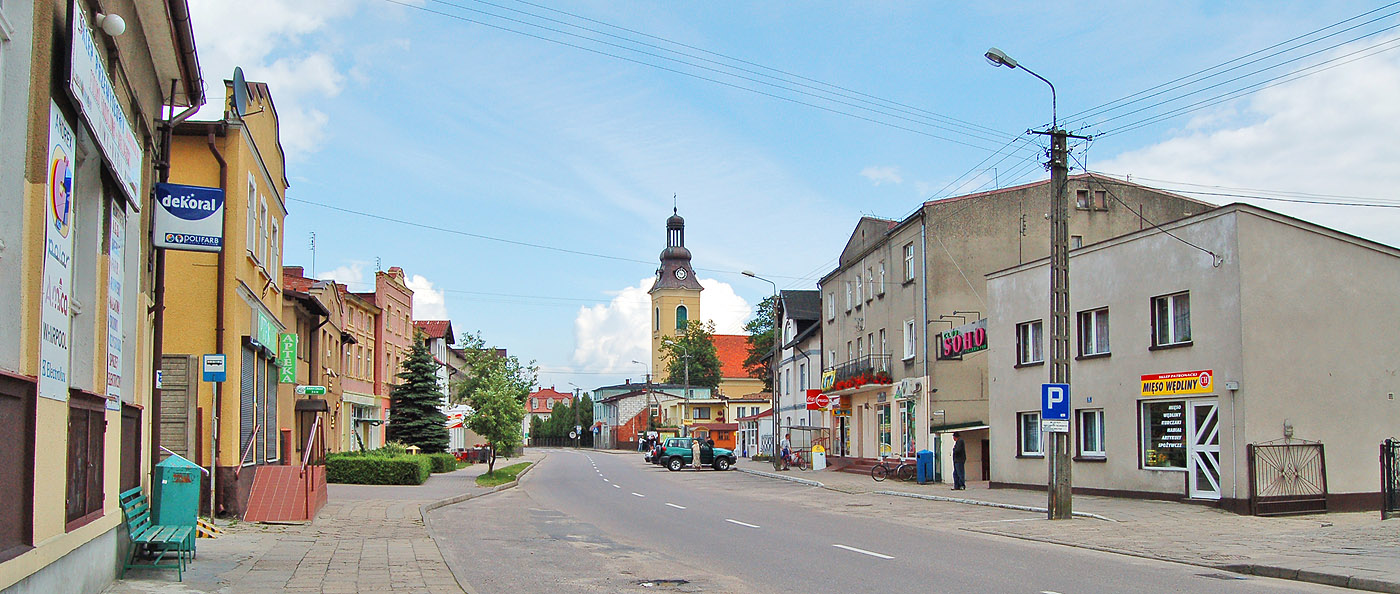
- Center of the village

- Location within Poland
- Coordinates: 53°52′4″N 18°23′56″E
- Country: Poland
- Voivodeship: Pomeranian
- County: Starogard
- Gmina: Lubichowo

Population
  - Total: 2,052
- Time zone: UTC+1 (CET)
  - Summer (DST): UTC+2 (CEST)
- Vehicle registration: GST

Lubichowo [lubiˈxɔvɔ] is a village in Starogard County, Pomeranian Voivodeship, in northern Poland. It is the seat of the gmina (administrative district) called Gmina Lubichowo. It is located within the ethnocultural region of Kociewie in the historic region of Pomerania.

An old church of Saint James is located in Lubichowo.

== History ==
Lubichowo was a royal village of the Polish Crown, administratively located in the Tczew County in the Pomeranian Voivodeship.

During the German occupation of Poland (World War II), on October 20, 1939, the Germans murdered local Polish teachers in the Szpęgawski Forest (see Intelligenzaktion). Also several Polish families were expelled from the village in 1942.

== Notable people ==
Florian Białka (1918–1940), Catholic professed cleric, murdered by the Germans in the Gusen concentration camp, considered one of the 108 Blessed Polish Martyrs of World War II, was born in the village.
