= Ocypel =

Village in Pomeranian Voivodeship, Poland

- Village
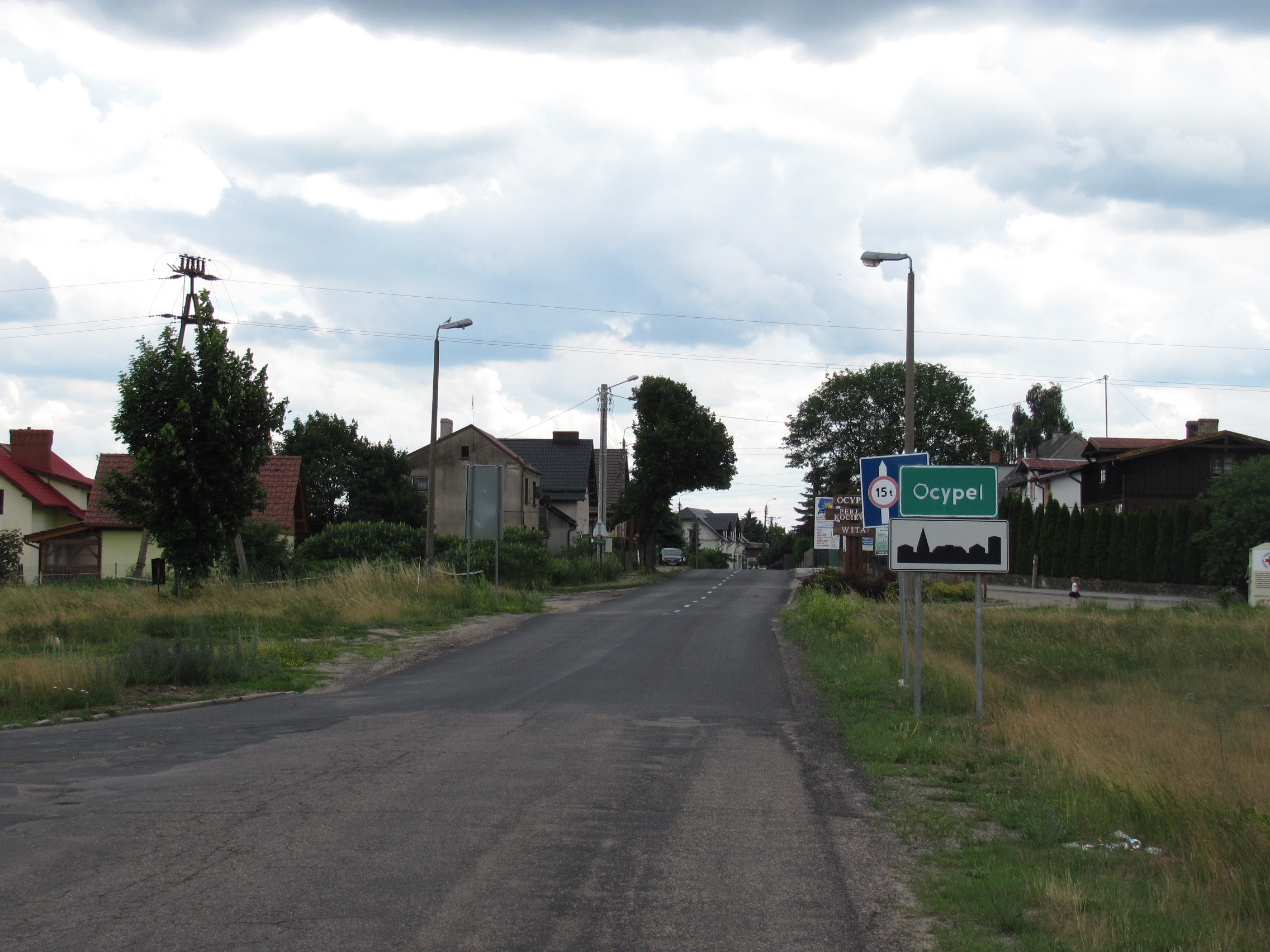
- Entrance of Ocypel

- Location within Poland
- Coordinates: 53°48′36″N 18°18′50″E
- Country: Poland
- Voivodeship: Pomeranian
- County: Starogard
- Gmina: Lubichowo
- Elevation: 99.3 m (326 ft)
- Population: 585
- Time zone: UTC+1 (CET)
  - Summer (DST): UTC+2 (CEST)
- Vehicle registration: GST

Ocypel [ɔˈt͡sɨpɛl] is a village in the administrative district of Gmina Lubichowo, within Starogard County, Pomeranian Voivodeship, in northern Poland. It is located within the ethnocultural region of Kociewie in the historic region of Pomerania.

== History ==
The village was mentioned for the first time in 1664. It was annexed by Prussia in the First Partition of Poland in 1772. After the First World War Ocypel became again part of Poland, as the country regained independence.

During World War II, the village was occupied by Germany from 1939 to 1945. The occupiers renamed it Reußberg. In 1944, Polish partisans shot the deputy chief of the secret German state police Gestapo from Tczew in Ocypel. In the German retaliation (by the order of the then chief of the Gestapo in Gdansk), more than twenty Poles were shot publicly (residents of Ocypel and surrounding areas, as well as members of the AK (Armia Krajowa = Home Army) intelligence network from Pomerania, brought from the Stutthof concentration camp). During the German occupation in 1944 in the forests surrounding the Ocypel there was a clash of Pomeranian M4 troops with German troops. After World War II, the forest areas of the Tucholskie Forests around the Ocypla became the operational area of the anti-communist guerillas.

== Tourism ==
In Ocypel, especially on the shores of Large Ocypel Lake, there are many resorts. The biggest one is the Scouts Summer Camp (ZHP Warsaw Praga-Południe).
