= Szteklin =

Village in Pomeranian Voivodeship, Poland

- Village
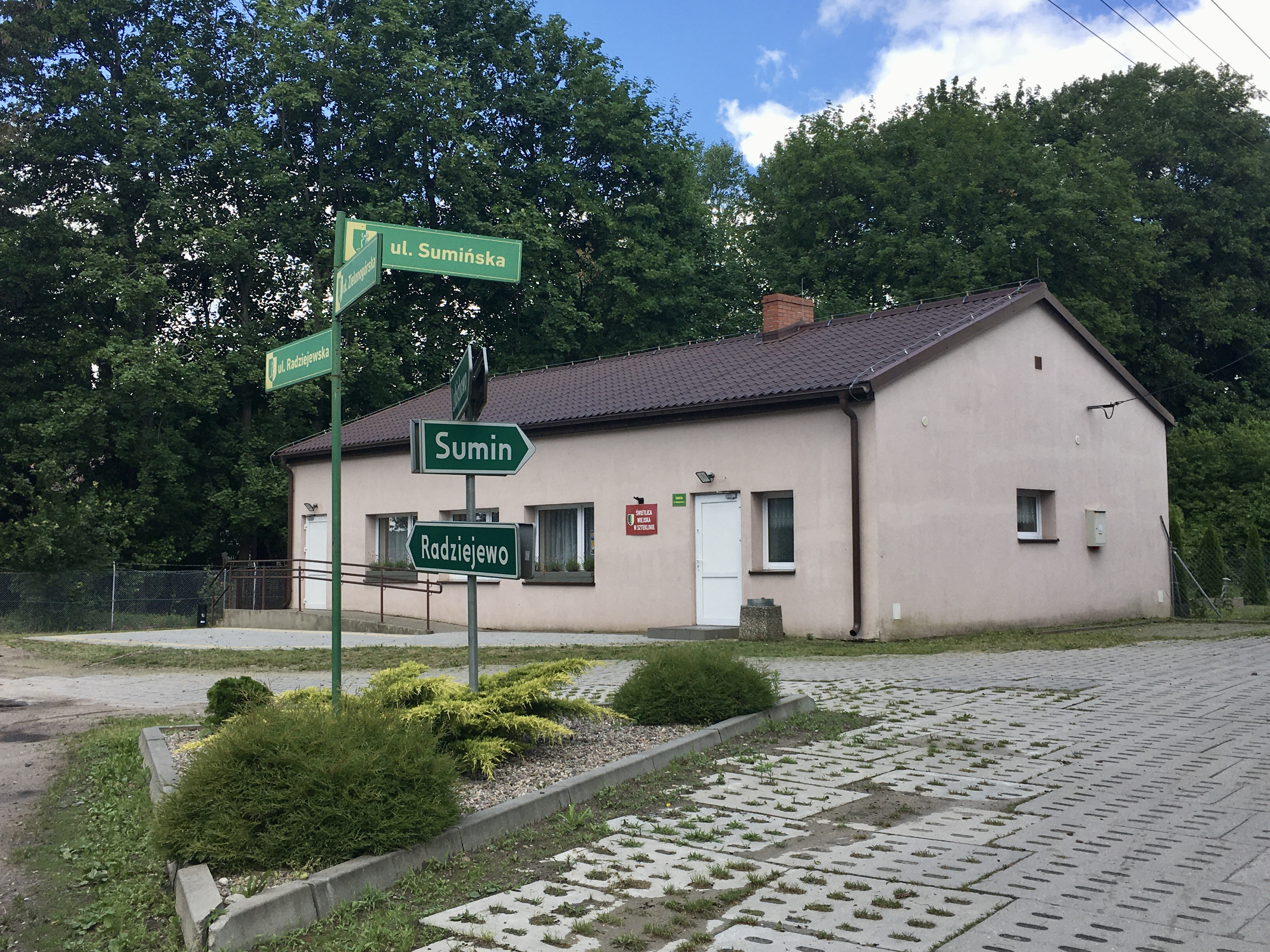
- The community centre in Szteklin

- Location within Poland
- Coordinates: 53°53′46″N 18°24′25″E
- Country: Poland
- Voivodeship: Pomeranian
- County: Starogard
- Gmina: Lubichowo

Population
  - Total: 112
- Time zone: UTC+1 (CET)
  - Summer (DST): UTC+2 (CEST)
- Vehicle registration: GST

Szteklin [ˈʂtɛklin] is a village in the administrative district of Gmina Lubichowo, within Starogard County, Pomeranian Voivodeship, in northern Poland. It is located in the ethnocultural region of Kociewie in the historic region of Pomerania.

== Historical monuments ==
- A larch manor from 1827
- A cowshed from the 19th century
- A granary from the 19th century
- A barn from the 20th century
