= Gmina Lubichowo =

Gmina Lubichowo Lubichowo Commune
- Gmina
- Coat of arms
- Interactive map of Gmina Lubichowo
- Coordinates (Lubichowo): 53°52′4″N 18°23′56″E
- Country: Poland
- Voivodeship: Pomeranian
- County: Starogard
- Seat: Lubichowo

Area
  - Total: 161.01 km^{2} (62.17 sq mi)

Population (2006)
  - Total: 5,627
  - Density: 34.95/km^{2} (90.52/sq mi)

Gmina Lubichowo is a rural gmina (administrative district) in Starogard County, Pomeranian Voivodeship, in northern Poland. Its seat is the village of Lubichowo, which lies approximately 15 kilometres (9 mi) south-west of Starogard Gdański and 58 km (36 mi) south of the regional capital Gdańsk.

The gmina covers an area of 161.01 square kilometres (62.2 sq mi), and as of 2006 its total population is 5,627.

== Villages ==
Gmina Lubichowo contains the villages and settlements of Baby, Bietowo, Budy, Kaliska, Krępki, Kujawy, Lipinki Królewskie, Lubichowo, Mermet, Młynki, Mościska, Ocypel, Osowo Leśne, Pawelec, Plony, Skowronek, Szlaga, Smolniki, Szteklin, Szteklinek, Wda, Wdecki Młyn, Wilcze Błota, Zelgoszcz, Zielona Góra and Ziemianek.

== Neighbouring gminas ==
Gmina Lubichowo is bordered by the gminas of Bobowo, Kaliska, Osieczna, Osiek, Skórcz, Starogard Gdański and Zblewo.
