= Otto Ernst Heinrich Klemperer =

German physicist (1899–1987)

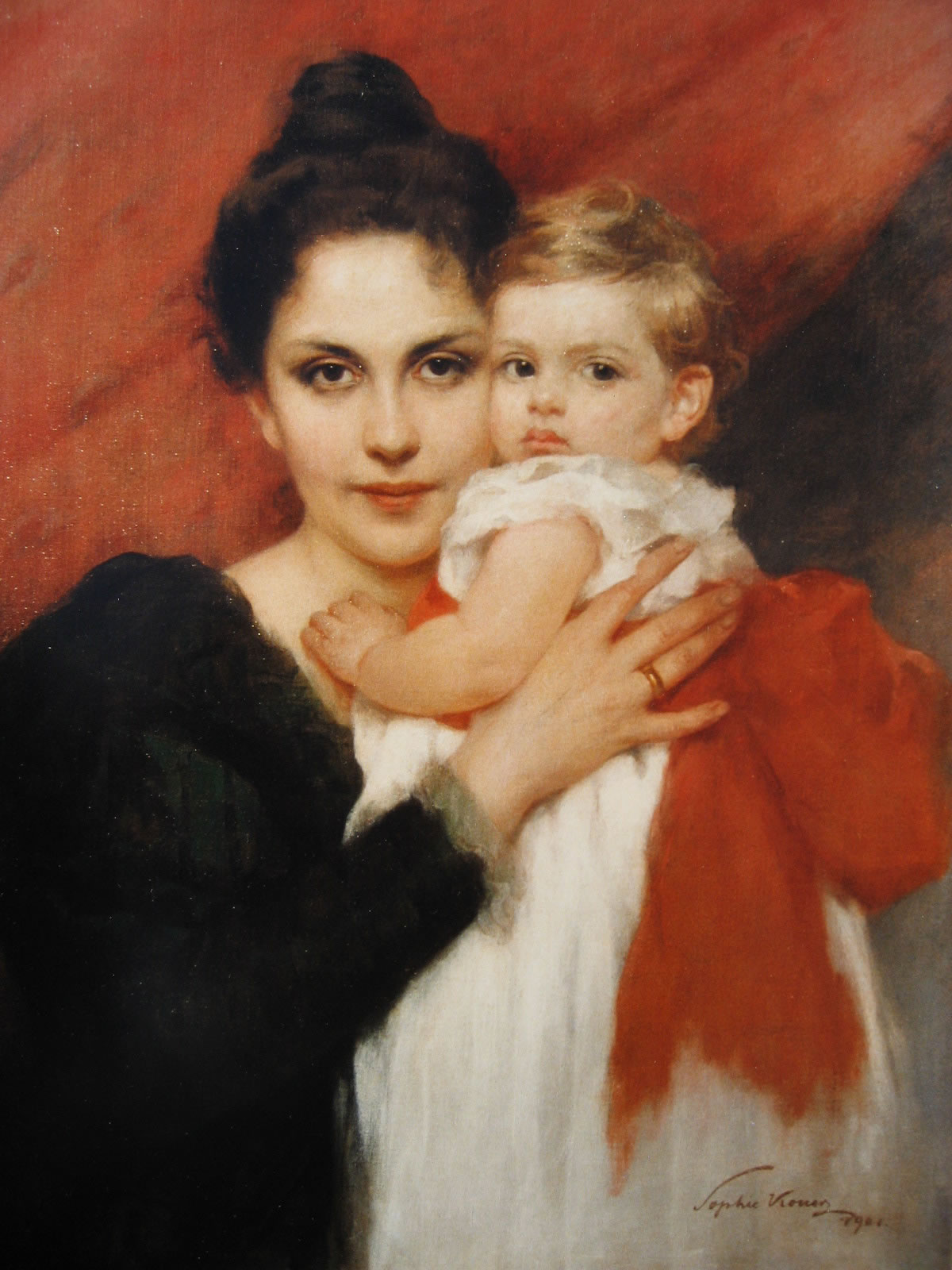
Maria Wilhelmine Klemperer with her son Otto, 1901, painted by Sophie Koner

Otto Ernst Heinrich Klemperer (1899 – 1987) was a physicist expert in electron optics. He was granted his doctorate by the Humboldt-Universität zu Berlin in 1923. His thesis advisor was Hans Geiger. He continued to work with Geiger in the 1930s.

Klemperer was co-inventor in 1928 of the Geiger-Klemperer ball counter, "the first major advance in the design of proportional counters". During the 1930s, he worked at the Cavendish Laboratory at the University of Cambridge on discrepancies between Fermi's theory of β-decay and the observed radiation properties of rubidium and polonium. He was later an assistant professor and Reader in Physics at Imperial College, London, where he wrote the third edition of his book on electron optics with Mike Barnett.

The conductor Otto Klemperer was his father's cousin. His uncle was the Romanist Victor Klemperer.

== Bibliography ==
- Klemperer, Otto; Barnett, M.E. (1971). Electron optics. Cambridge monographs on physics (3 ed.). Cambridge University Press. ISBN 978-0-521-17973-7.
- Klemperer, Otto (1972). Electron physics: the physics of the free electron. Butterworths.
