= Osowo Leśne =

Village in Pomeranian Voivodeship, Poland

- Village
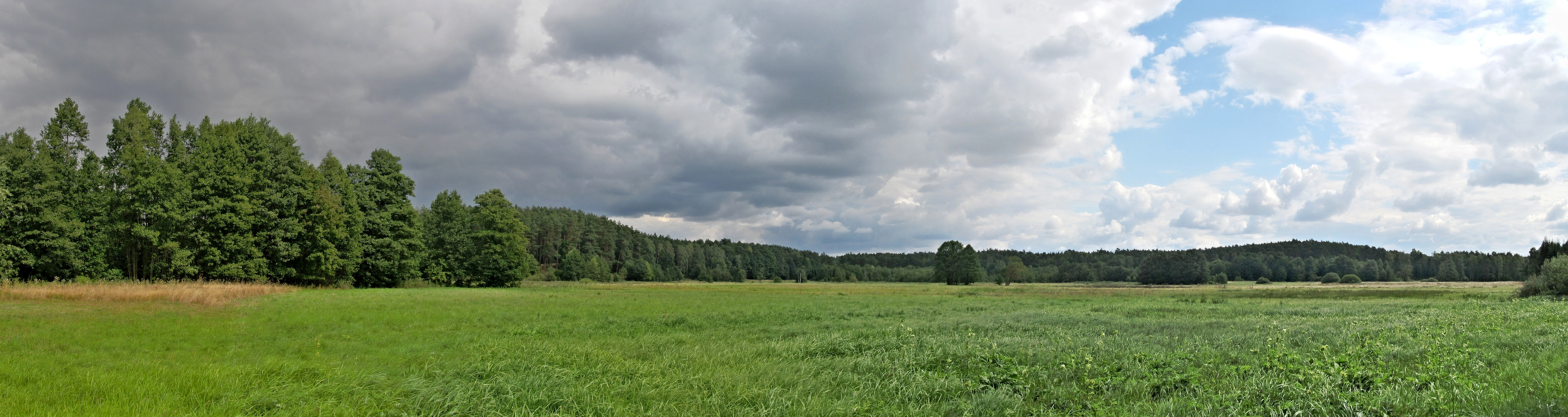
- Meadow in Osowo Leśne

- Location within Poland
- Coordinates: 53°51′50″N 18°19′26″E
- Country: Poland
- Voivodeship: Pomeranian
- County: Starogard
- Gmina: Lubichowo
- Population: 474
- Time zone: UTC+1 (CET)
  - Summer (DST): UTC+2 (CEST)
- Vehicle registration: GST

Osowo Leśne [ɔˈsɔvɔ ˈlɛɕnɛ] is a village in the administrative district of Gmina Lubichowo, within Starogard County, Pomeranian Voivodeship, in northern Poland. It is located within the ethnocultural region of Kociewie in the historic region of Pomerania.
