= Sophie Koner =

German painter

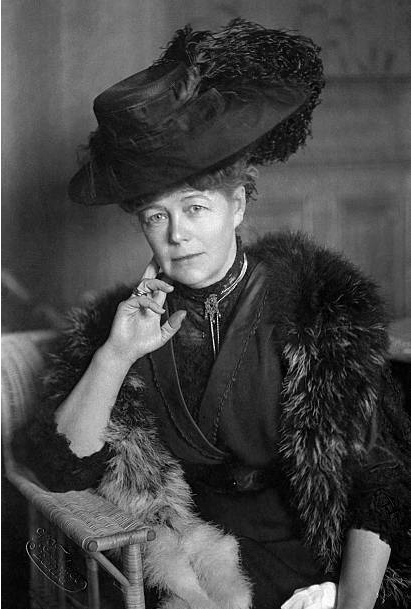
Sophie Koner; by Wilhelm Fechner (1909)

Sophie Koner, née Schäffer (13 July 1855, London – 1 June 1929, Berlin) was a German portrait painter.

== Life and work ==
Her first painting lessons were in Paris, with Carolus-Duran. Back in Berlin, she took lessons from Max Koner, who was very popular in high society as a portrait painter. She eventually became his private student. They were married in 1886.

They painted several portraits of each other. Encouraged by Max, she exhibited one of him at the Academy of Arts in 1888. Between 1893 and 1920, she participated in numerous exhibitions there. In 1896, she was awarded a gold medal at the Große Berliner Kunstausstellung.

By the 1890s, Max was receiving so many commissions for portraits that she became discreetly employed in finishing them; adding some of the clothing and backgrounds. Following his sudden death at the age of forty-six, she began to specialize in portraits of children, to express her own personal talents. She was adept at entertaining small children while they were posing, so that even large families could be portrayed with little fuss. Her work also includes a handful of landscapes.

She died at the age of seventy-three, and was interred next to Max at the Friedhöfe vor dem Halleschen Tor in the Kreuzberg district. Neither grave has been preserved.

== Selected paintings ==
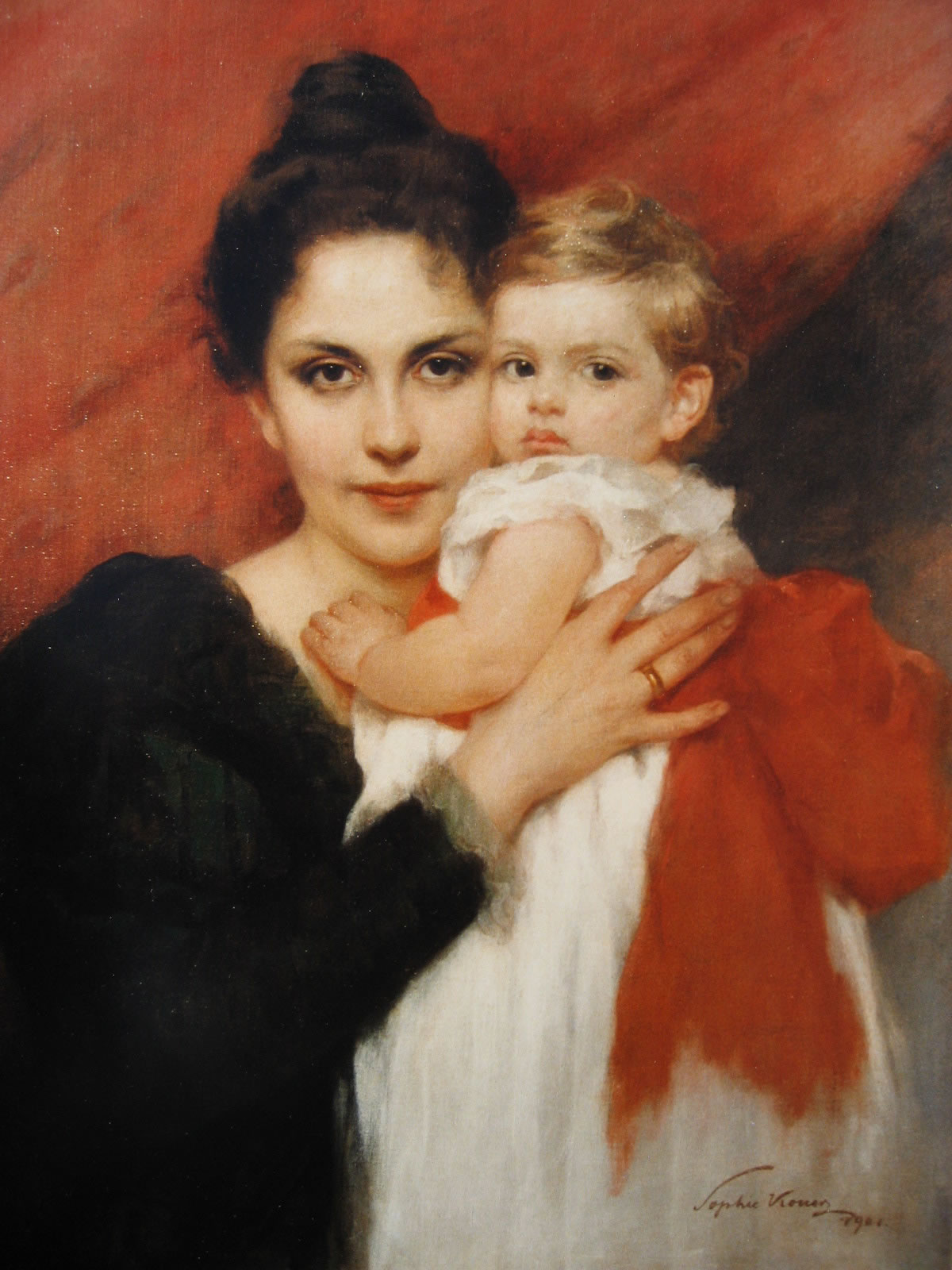
Maria Klemperer with her son, Otto

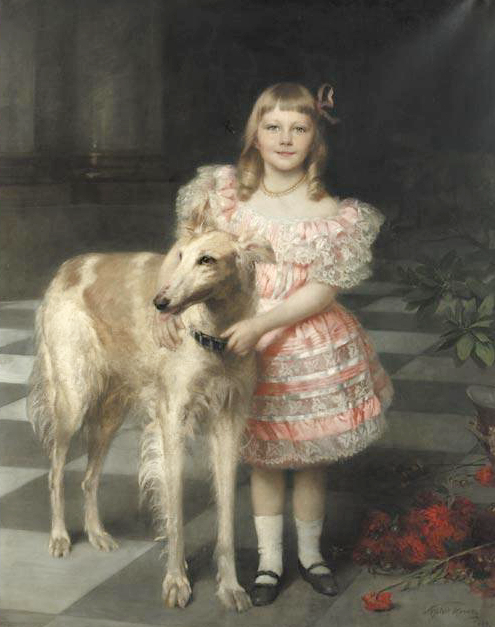
Princess Victoria Luise of Prussia

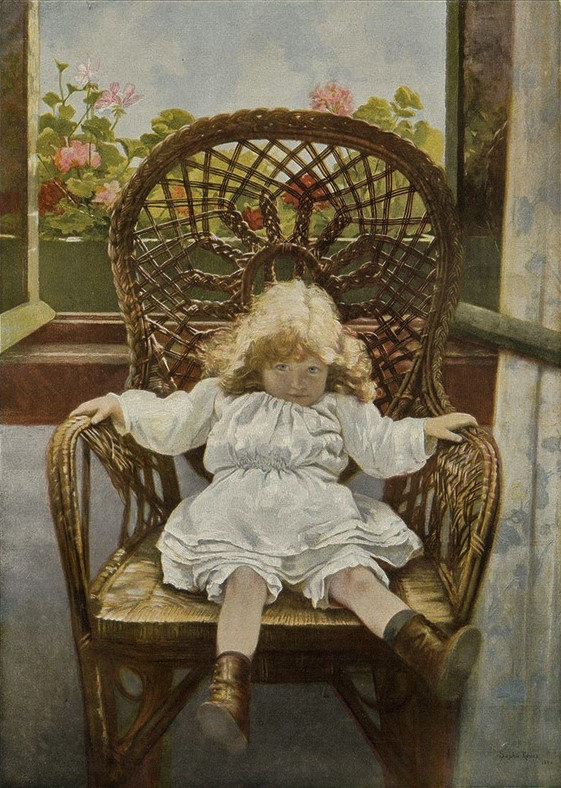
A Little Child

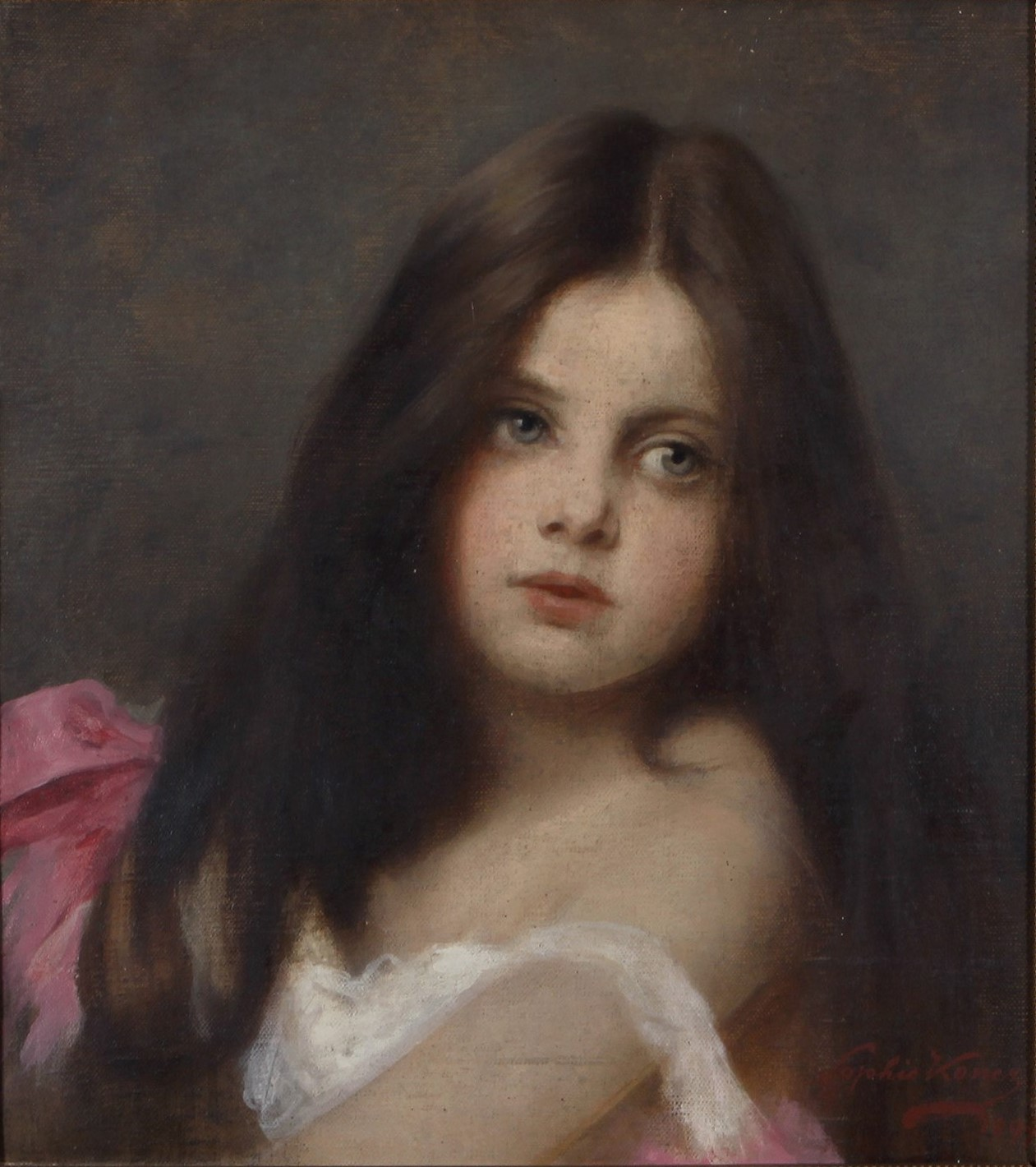
Portrait of a Girl

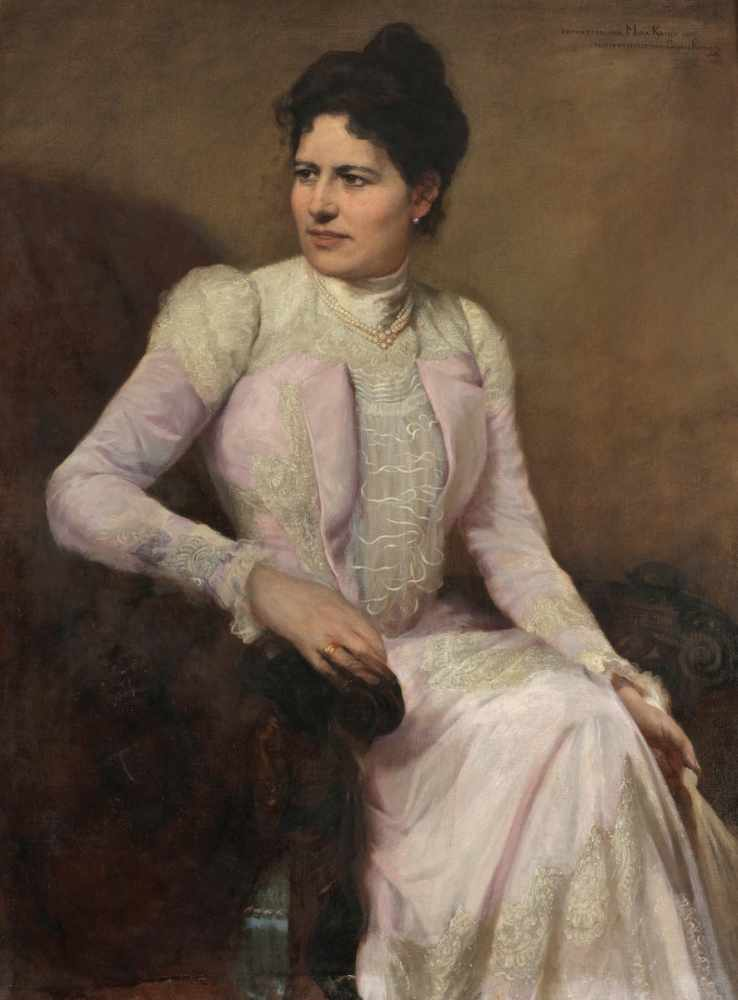
Countess Gabriele von Moltke
