= Kaliska, Gmina Lubichowo =

Village in Pomeranian Voivodeship, Poland

Kaliska
- Village
- Location within Poland
- Coordinates: 53°52′11″N 18°24′49″E
- Country: Poland
- Voivodeship: Pomeranian
- County: Starogard
- Gmina: Lubichowo
- Time zone: UTC+1 (CET)
  - Summer (DST): UTC+2 (CEST)
- Vehicle registration: GST

Kaliska [kaˈliska] is a village in the administrative district of Gmina Lubichowo, within Starogard County, Pomeranian Voivodeship, in northern Poland. It is located within the ethnocultural region of Kociewie in the historic region of Pomerania.
