= Zelgoszcz, Pomeranian Voivodeship =

Village in Pomeranian Voivodeship, Poland

Zelgoszcz
- Village
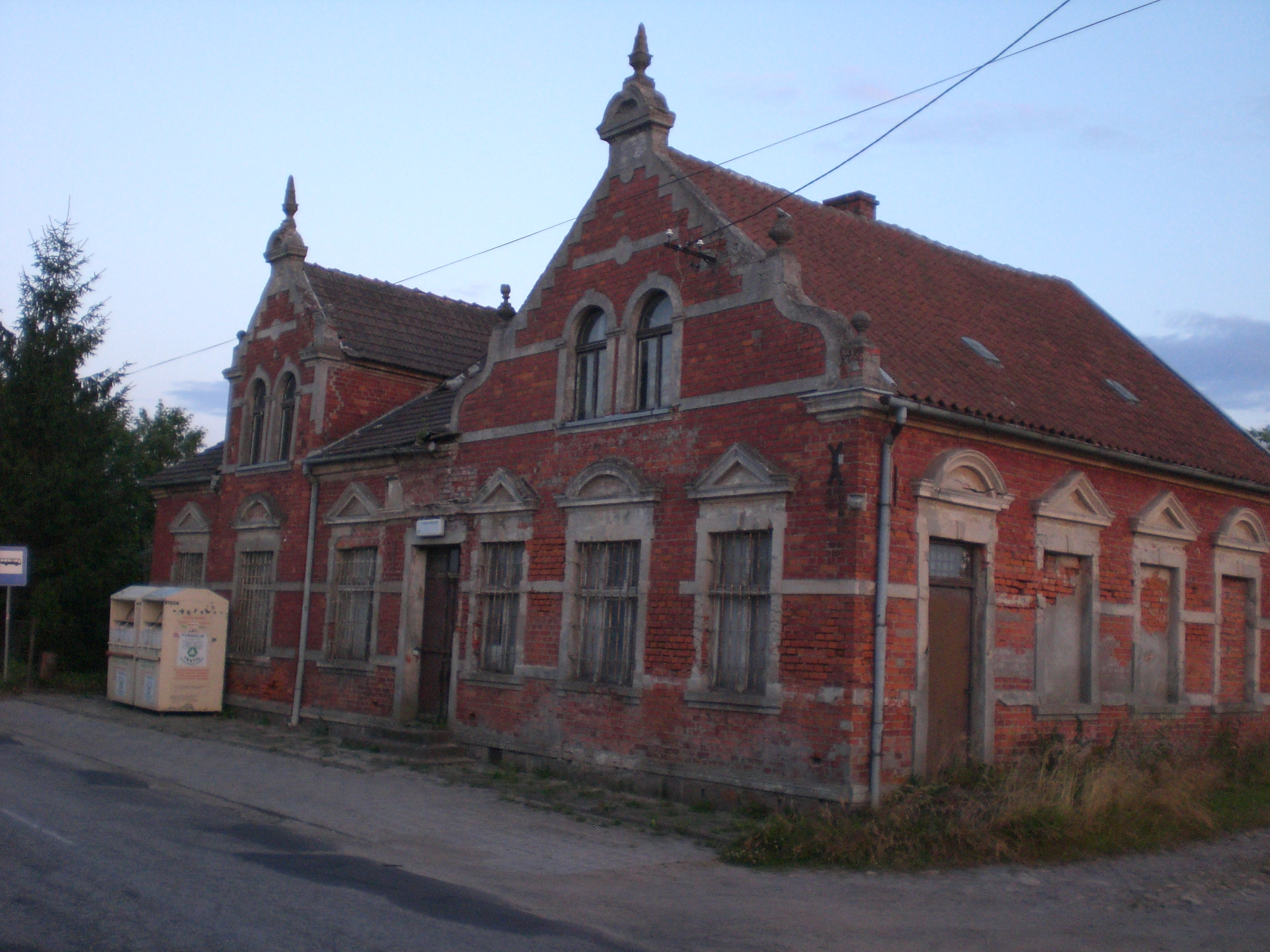

- Location within Poland
- Coordinates: 53°50′1″N 18°25′48″E
- Country: Poland
- Voivodeship: Pomeranian
- County: Starogard
- Gmina: Lubichowo
- Population: 906
- Time zone: UTC+1 (CET)
  - Summer (DST): UTC+2 (CEST)
- Vehicle registration: GST

Zelgoszcz [ˈzɛlɡɔʂt͡ʂ] is a village in the administrative district of Gmina Lubichowo, within Starogard County, Pomeranian Voivodeship, in northern Poland. It is located within the ethnocultural region of Kociewie in the historic region of Pomerania.

== History ==
Zelgoszcz was a royal village of the Kingdom of Poland, administratively located in the Tczew County in the Pomeranian Voivodeship.

During the German occupation of Poland (World War II), in 1939, the Germans murdered local Polish teachers in the Szpęgawski Forest (see Intelligenzaktion).
