= Skowronek, Pomeranian Voivodeship =

Village in Pomeranian Voivodeship, Poland

Skowronek
- Settlement
- Location within Poland
- Coordinates: 53°51′22″N 18°19′3″E
- Country: Poland
- Voivodeship: Pomeranian
- County: Starogard
- Gmina: Lubichowo
- Time zone: UTC+1 (CET)
  - Summer (DST): UTC+2 (CEST)
- Vehicle registration: GST

Skowronek [skɔˈvrɔnɛk] is a settlement in the administrative district of Gmina Lubichowo, within Starogard County, Pomeranian Voivodeship, in northern Poland. It is located in the ethnocultural region of Kociewie in the historic region of Pomerania. The name means "lark" in Polish.
