= Pawelec =

Village in Pomeranian Voivodeship, Poland

- Settlement
- Location within Poland
- Coordinates: 53°48′35″N 18°23′35″E
- Country: Poland
- Voivodeship: Pomeranian
- County: Starogard
- Gmina: Lubichowo
- Time zone: UTC+1 (CET)
  - Summer (DST): UTC+2 (CEST)
- Vehicle registration: GST

Pawelec [paˈvɛlɛt͡s] is a settlement in the administrative district of Gmina Lubichowo, within Starogard County, Pomeranian Voivodeship, in northern Poland. It is located in the ethnocultural region of Kociewie in the historic region of Pomerania.
