= Skowronek (surname) =

Skowronek is a Polish-language surname, meaning literally lark. Spelling variants include Skowroneck and Skovronek. Notable people with the surname include:

- Artur Skowronek (born 1982), Polish football manager
- Ben Skowronek (born 1997), American football player
- Felix Skowronek (1937–2006), American flutist
- Martin Skowroneck (1926–2014), German harpsichord builder
- Michał Skowronek (born 1949), Polish runner
- Ryszard Skowronek (born 1949), Polish decathlete
- Stephen Skowronek (born 1951), American political scientist
