= Willy Hamacher =

German painter (1865–1909)

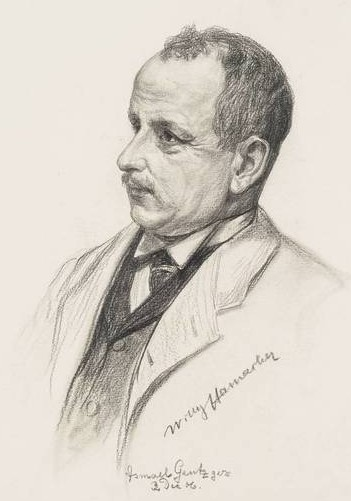
Willy Hamacher; by Ismael Gentz (1906)

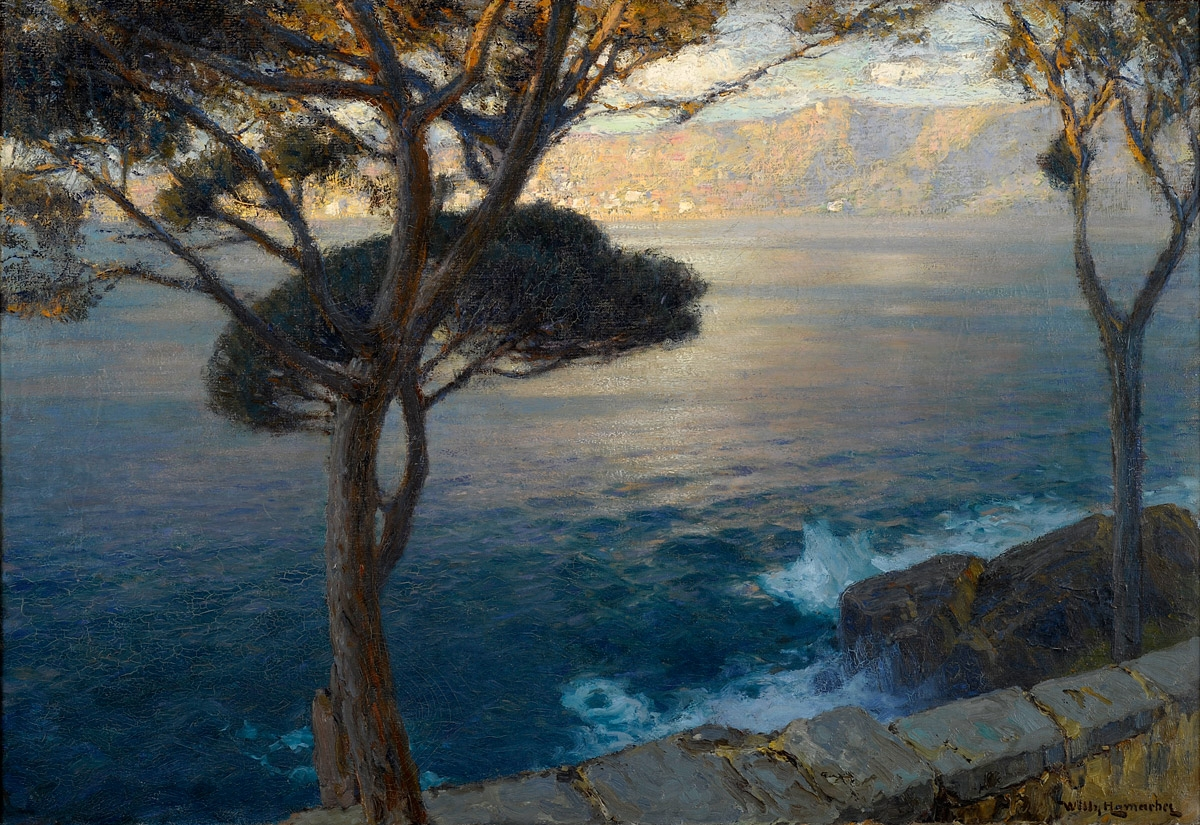
The Italian Riviera

Willy Hamacher (10 July 1865 – 9 July 1909) was a German landscape and marine painter.

== Life and work ==
He was born in Breslau. His father, Theodor Hamacher, who died four months before he was born, was a painter; as was his older brother, Alfred.

He began by studying landscape painting at the Silesian Museum of Fine Arts, under the tutelage of Carl Cowen Schirm. From 1888 to 1889, he continued his studies at the Kunstakademie Düsseldorf with Eugen Dücker. From 1889, he was a member of the progressive artists' association, Malkasten.

Later, from 1890 to 1894, he was able to perfect his techniques in Berlin, at the Prussian Academy of Arts, where he studied with Hans Gude, who had been Schirm's teacher. During that time, he opened his own studio near the Tiergarten. In 1895 he moved to the Tauentzienstraße, where he operated a painting school "for men and women". After 1904, he lived and worked in Wilmersdorf.

He travelled extensively; to Sweden, France, England and Italy. He initially favored Nordic coastal landscapes, but later came to prefer the brighter scenery of Italy. His major exhibitions included those at the Glaspalast (1888), the Große Berliner Kunstausstellung (from 1889), where he was awarded a small gold medal in 1896, and with the Berlin Secession (1898).

Hamacher died in 1909 in Bad Reinerz.
