= Art collection of Carl Sachs =

Possibly looted by Nazis

The art collection of Carl Sachs, a Jewish entrepreneur (b. 1858 in Jauer/Jawor, d. 1943 in Basel) who lived with his wife Margarethe in a villa in what was then Kleinburgstraße in Breslau, before 1939 he emigrated to Switzerland with his wife to escape Nazi persecution, included numerous paintings, watercolors and graphics.

== Description of the Sachs art collection ==
Sachs' art collection included works by the French artists Jean-Baptiste Camille Corot, Gustave Courbet, Eugène Delacroix, Claude Monet, Camille Pissarro, Pierre-Auguste Renoir and Alfred Sisley and by the German artists Wilhelm Leibl, Wilhelm Trübner, Fritz von Uhde, Lovis Corinth, Max Slevogt and Max Liebermann. There were also paintings by Hans Purrmann, who was close to Matisse, and Dutch paintings of the 17th century by David Teniers the Younger.

Sachs also owned a collection of prints and drawings including works by James McNeill Whistler, Edvard Munch, Henri de Toulouse-Lautrec, Francisco de Goya, Jean-Baptiste Camille Corot, Pablo Picasso and Honoré Daumier. Sculptures by German and French artists were also part of his collection, including works by Georg Kolbe and Aristide Maillol.

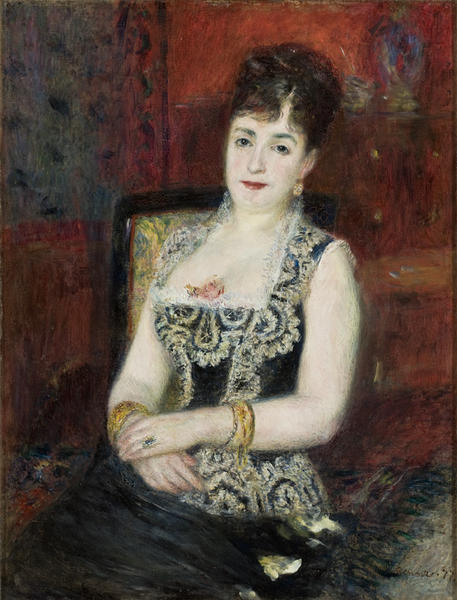
Auguste Renoir: Porträt der Gräfin Poutrales, heute Museu de Arte de São Paulo

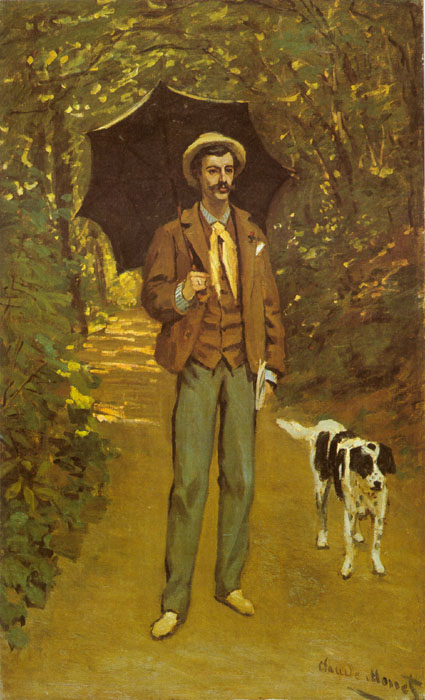
Claude Monet: Bildnis von Victor Jacquemont mit Sonnenschirm, heute Kunsthaus Zürich

== Nazi-era seizures ==
Sachs was Jewish and as such subject to persecution and asset seizure by the Nazis. The German Lost Art Foundation currently lists 45 artworks that belonged to Sachs. Examples of listed artworks include Menzel's Der Koch, which was confiscated in 1940 from the Silesian Museum of Fine Arts Wroclaw and Courbet's Stillleben mit Äpfeln in einem Teller und Wein auf einem Tisch, which was the object of a settlement with Sach's heirs in 2018.

Research into the Nazi looting of the Sachs collection is ongoing.

== See also ==
- Ismar Littmann Art Collection
- List of claims for restitution for Nazi-looted art
- The Holocaust

== Literature ==
- Arthur Lindner: Die Gemälde-Sammlung Carl Sachs. In: Kunstchronik 9. Juni 1916, p. 362–364
- Margot Rieß: Breslauer Kunstbrief: Die Bilder der Sammlung Sachs . In: Kunstwanderer 3 (1921/1922), p. 477–478
- Karl Scheffler: Breslauer Kunstleben . In: Kunst und Künstler Jg. 21 (1923), p. 111ff.
- Die Sammlung Carl Sachs. Graphik des XIX. Jahrhunderts. Versteigerung durch C.G. Boerner, Leipzig, und Paul Cassirer. Berlin/Leipzig 1931
- Erich Wiese: Die Stiftung Carl Sachs für das Schlesische Museum der Bildenden Künste in Breslau, . In: Zeitschrift für Kunstgeschichte 1 (1932), p. 149–152.
- Ewa Frąckowiak: Ryciny autorskie z drugiej połowy XIX wieku i początków XX wieku z kolekcji Carla Sachsa. In: Z dziejów rysunku i grafiki na Śląsku oraz w kolekcjach i zbiorach ze Śląskiem związanych . red. Bogusław Czechowicz, Arkadiusz Dobrzyniecki, Izabela Żak, Wrocław 1999, p. 203–214
- Monika Tatzkow, Hans Joachim Hinz: Bürger, Opfer und die historische Gerechtigkeit. Das Schicksal jüdischer Kunstsammler in Breslau, In: Osteuropa 56 (2006), p. 155–171
- Ramona Bräu: „Arisierung“ in Breslau – Die „Entjudung“ einer deutschen Großstadt und deren Entdeckung im polnischen Erinnerungsdiskurs . VDM Verlag Dr. Müller, Saarbrücken 2008, ISBN 978-3-8364-5958-7, p. 77ff. (3.4.2 Die großen jüdischen Kunstsammlungen in Schlesien – Kunstraub.)
- Annerose Klammt, Marius Winzeler: „Die Moderne deutsche Kunst musste zur Geltung gebracht werden“ – Zur Erwerbung von Kunstwerken aus jüdischem Eigentum für die Kunstsammlungen in Görlitz, In: Beiträge öffentlicher Einrichtungen der Bundesrepublik Deutschland zum Umgang mit Kulturgütern aus ehemaligen jüdischen Besitz, hrsg. von Ulf Häder, Magdeburg 2001, p. 119–141
- Marius Winzeler: Jüdische Sammler und Mäzene in Breslau – von der Donation zur „Verwertung“ ihres Kunstbesitzes, In: Sammeln. Stiften. Fördern. Jüdische Mäzene in der deutschen Gesellschaft, red. Andrea Baresel-Brand, Peter Müller, Magdeburg 2006, p. 131–150
