= Lady Walking by a Fountain in the Kissingen Spa Garden =

Painting by Adolph Menzel

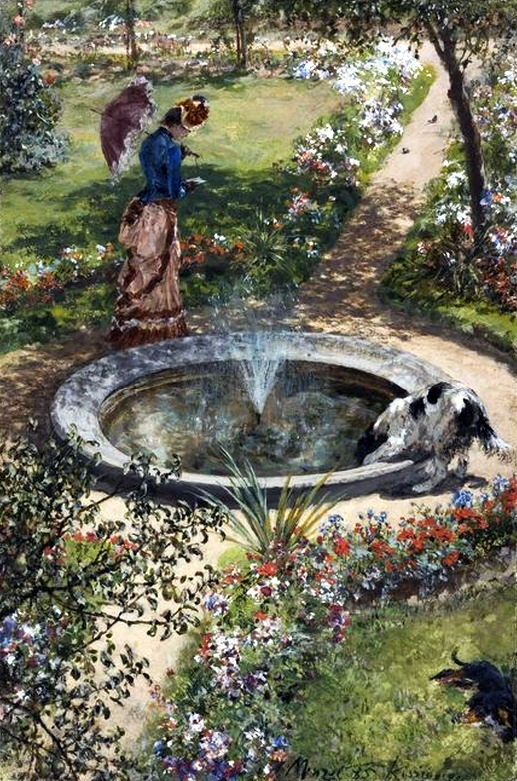
- Artist: Adolph Menzel
- Year: 1885
- Medium: gouache on paper
- Dimensions: 17.7 cm × 11.6 cm (7.0 in × 4.6 in)
- Location: National Museum, Warsaw

Lady Walking by a Fountain in the Kissingen Spa Garden is a gouache on paper painting by German artist Adolph Menzel, from 1885. The work depicts a Summer garden scene that takes place in Bad Kissingen, where Menzel shows the influence of the contemporary style of French impressionism, both in terms of motif and technique. The painting is in the collection of the National Museum in Warsaw.

== History ==
Menzel was a frequent guest in Bad Kissingen, staying with his sister's family, especially after the death of his brother-in-law, in 1880. Menzel regularly would stay in the Hailmann Villa at Kurhausstrasse 3 (currently the Martin-Luther-Strasse 9). From one of the rooms in this villa, he could look onto the spa gardens, as can be seen by the current painting. The view taken from the window is a recurring motif in Menzel's work and can be seen, for example, in some paintings done in Berlin, like Hinterhaus und Hof (1844), now at the Nationalgalerie, in Berlin.

Menzel drew other views of the spa gardens in pencil during a stay in 1886. In these pictures, the paths and a fountain can also be seen, but neither people nor animals populate the scene. In these drawings, color has no role; instead, Menzel was concerned with depicting lighting conditions at different times of day. In other pictures from Kissingen, Menzel showed the hustle and bustle of the spa town. For example, he depicted children playing and other spa guests in the gouache Coffee Time in Kissingen (1886; private collection), and in the colorful gouache Breakfast Buffet at the Fine Bakery in Kissingen (1893; private collection), he depicts a crowd of people busy in several ways. These densely populated paintings are a thematic counterpart to the current Lady Walking by a Fountain in the Kissingen Spa Garden.

== Description ==
The painting, executed in a small format as a gouache on paper, shows a peaceful and unspectacular scene on a Summer day in Bad Kissingen. From an elevated position, taken from a non-visible window, the view is directed towards part of the spa garden. A sandy path connects the lower left corner diagonally with the upper right corner. In the middle of the picture, the path circles a round fountain with a plain stone surround. A small fountain sprays in the basin filled with water. The path is bordered by flower beds with a multitude of densely packed colorful flowers in red, blue, white and violet. These flowers and leaves in particular show a brush application of small dabs of color that is similar to the style of the French open-air painting done by Menzel's contemporaries. In addition to the flowerbeds, there are green lawns at the bottom right and top left. In the bottom left corner, the branches of a tree with green leaves reach into the painting as far as the fountain and partially cover the path. Another tree stands above the fountain on the right. It has a thin trunk and only the lower part of its foliage is visible, the rest of the tree is cut off by the upper edge of the picture. This tree casts its brown shadow on the areas above the fountain. Parallel to the upper edge of the painting, another path runs as a horizon line, which is also lined with trees and flowers.

Menzel has equipped this garden view with several characters, giving the composition, which is characterized by geometric shapes, some enlivening elements. To the left, above the fountain, an elegant lady is seen walking in the shade, portrayed from the side in profile. She has tilted her head forward and is studying a piece of paper held in her right hand, possibly a letter, but also could be a leaflet for an event in the spa town. Over her left shoulder, which is turned away from the viewer, she has placed an open parasol, the dark red fabric of which is set off with a white border. The parasol fills the space behind her back and neck. On her head, the lady wears a yellowish bonnet with decorative red ribbons. The headgear leaves large parts of the back of her head free, so that her dark hair is visible. Her two-part dress consists of a long-sleeved dark blue top with a narrow waist and a floor-length skirt. The skirt, made of pink fabric, is set off with several red ribbons. Opposite the lady, on the lower right edge of the fountain, a medium-sized dog with black and white fur is shown from the side. While it is supporting itself with its hind paws in front of the fountain, its left front paw is already over the edge of the fountain and his head is sticking out into the fountain - he is probably drinking from the water. In the bottom right corner, a cat with dark fur is lying stretched out on the lawn. In addition, two sparrows have settled on the footpath at the top right. The lady and the various animals in the painting do not interact, but coexist peacefully. Menzel used the view from above not only to reproduce a specific observation, but rather to deal intensively with the themes of light and color. The gouache is signed and dated "Menzel 85 Kissingen" on the lower edge of the painting.

== Provenance ==
The gouache came into the collection of the Breslau entrepreneur Heinrich von Korn, in 1885, the year it was created. He donated it to the Silesian Museum of Fine Arts, in 1905. After the museum's holdings were relocated and the museum building was destroyed in World War II, the Polish authorities took the painting to the National Museum, in Warsaw, in 1946, where it has been since then.
