= Silesian Museum of Fine Arts =

Museum in Wroclaw, Poland

Coordinates: 51°06′39″N 17°02′51.4″E

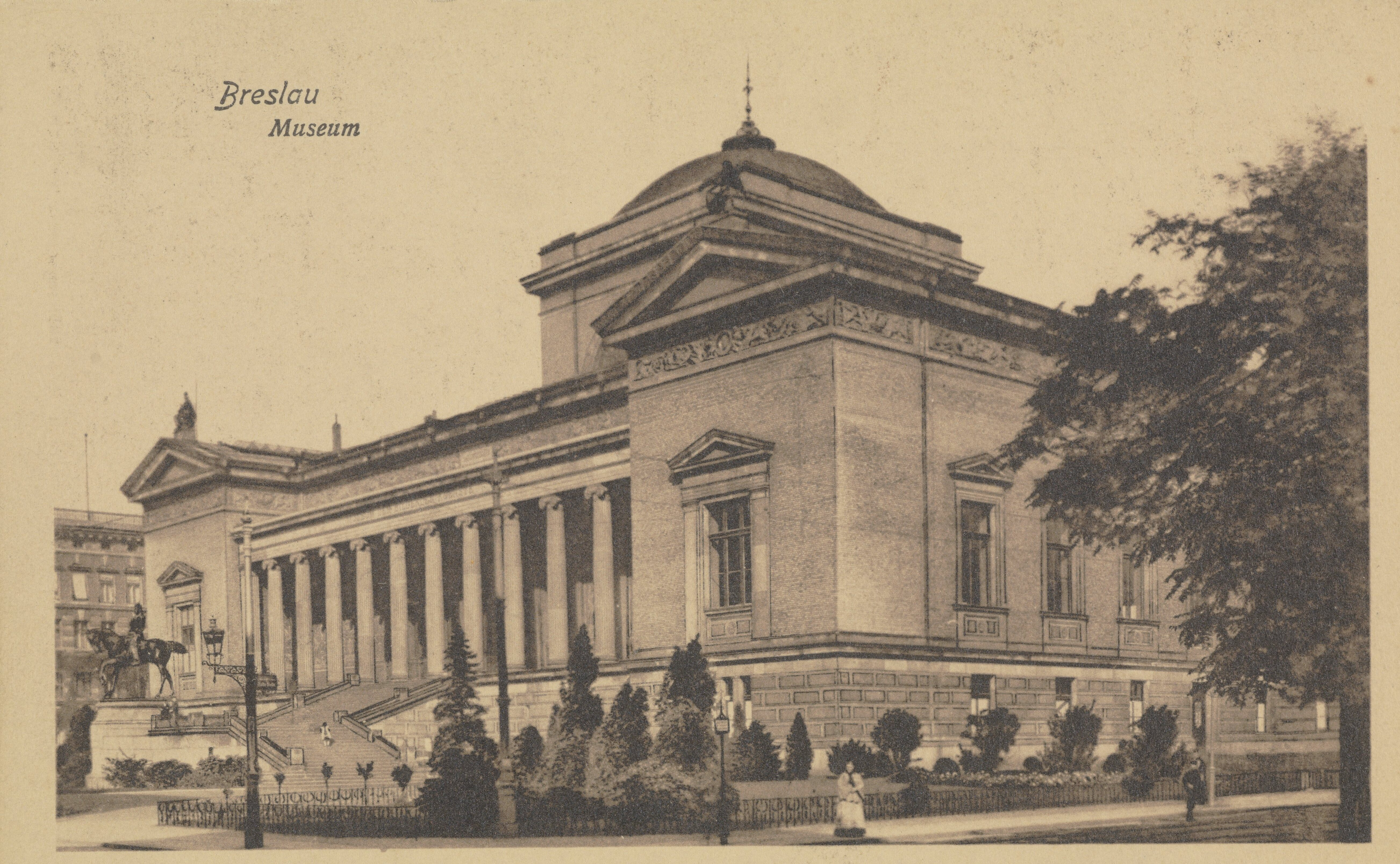
Silesian Museum of Fine Arts, Breslau

The Silesian Museum of Fine Arts in Breslau (German: Schlesisches Museum für bildende Künste in Breslau) was an art museum located on Museum Square in Breslau, Prussia. The museum had operated from 1880 to 1945, when it burned down after the bombing.

== History ==
The beginning of the museum was the collection of paintings of the Breslau Royal Museum of Art and Antiquity (Königlichen Museums für Kunst und Altertümer), which from 1815 was located in the former Augustinian monastery on Wyspa Piasek (later one of the buildings of the University Library).

In the middle of the 19th century, plans were made to build a new museum, designed by the Berlin architect Otto Rathey. In 1869, a museum building committee was established. The sgraffito decorations were made by Otto Lessing and the paintings by Hermann Prell. In 1880, the grand opening of the new museum took place in the presence of Emperor Wilhelm I. The building was to resemble an ancient Greek temple; in front of the main entrance there was a portico with ten Ionic columns. Inside there were 14 exhibition halls. On 26 October 1901, an equestrian statue of Emperor Frederick III was unveiled in front of the main entrance. The collection initially consisted mainly of works of sacred art and German paintings (among others by Andreas Achenbach, Lucas Cranach the Elder and A. von Menzel) and Western European paintings (e.g., Sandro Botticelli) as well as copies of ancient sculptures. After 1911, it also included works by Picasso and Van Gogh.

Just before the end of World War II, the exhibits were hidden for fear of destruction in 80 different places in Silesia. The library collection was placed in the Herder Institute in Marburg. During the siege of Festung Breslau, the museum building was bombed and burned. After the war, the museum was moved to the former building of the Silesian Regency. The ruins were completely demolished in 1964, and in 1969 the School and Kindergarten Complex no. 13 was built on the site. The streets where the museum stood are called "Muzealna Street" and "Muzealna Square".

Most of the museum's collection was destroyed by warfare and looting; a small part has been preserved in the National Museum in Wrocław. The most valuable exhibits from the Wroclaw collection were transferred in 1946 to the National Museum in Warsaw, including Sandro Botticelli's painting Madonna with Child, John the Baptist and an Angel, Lucas Cranach the Elder's painting Adam and Eve, St. Luke Painting an Image of Mary, Pietà from Lubiaz, Polyptych of Annunciation with Unicorn, Gentile Bellini's Portrait of Lorenzo Giustiniani, and Beautiful Madonna of Wroclaw.

== Gallery ==
=== Religious art ===
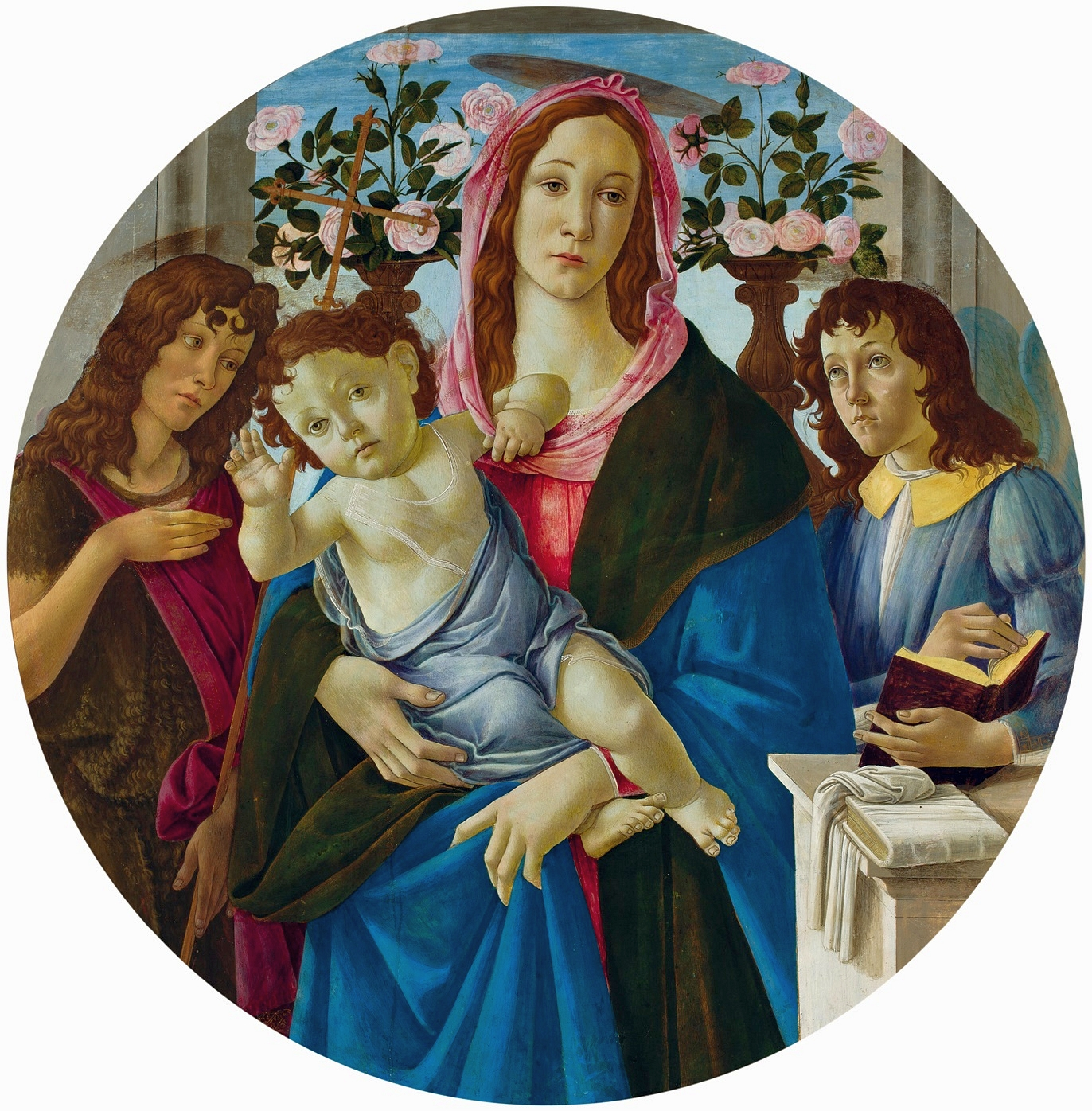
Botticelli:
Madonna with Child. Now in National Museum in Warsaw.

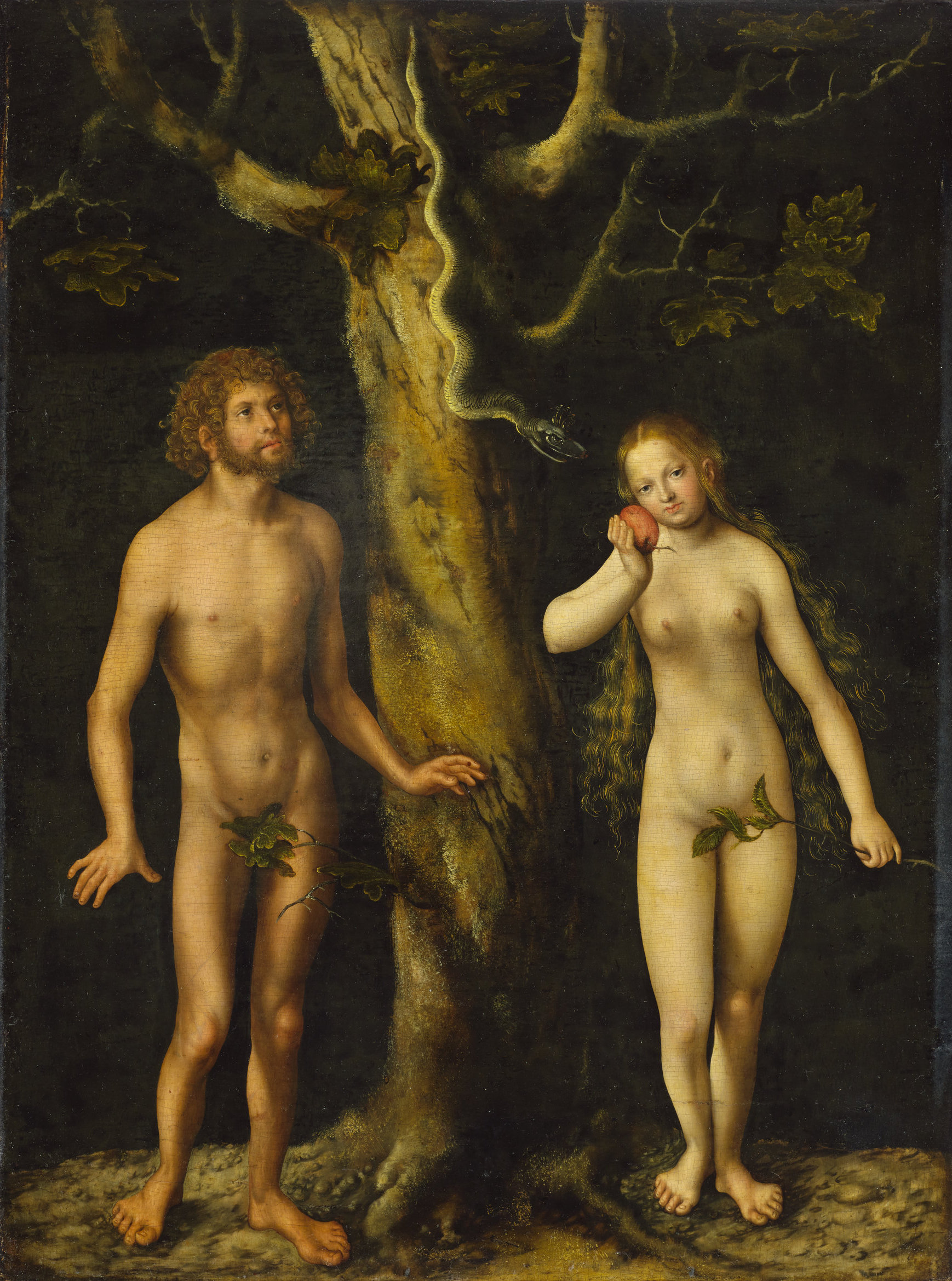
Lucas Cranach d. Ä.:
Adam and Eva. Now in National Museum in Warsaw.

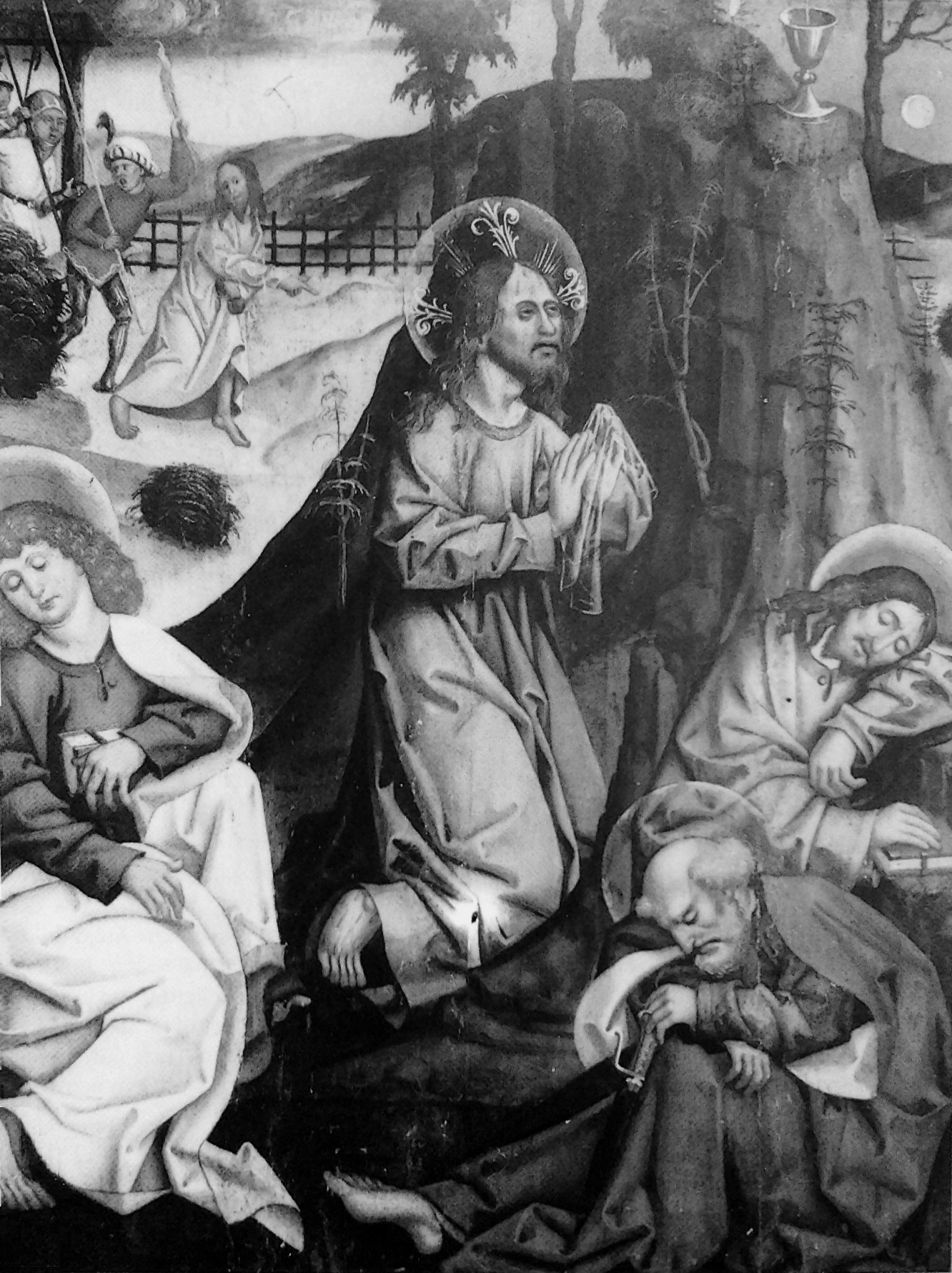
Agony in the Garden by Jan Polack, 1510s. Now in National Museum in Warsaw.

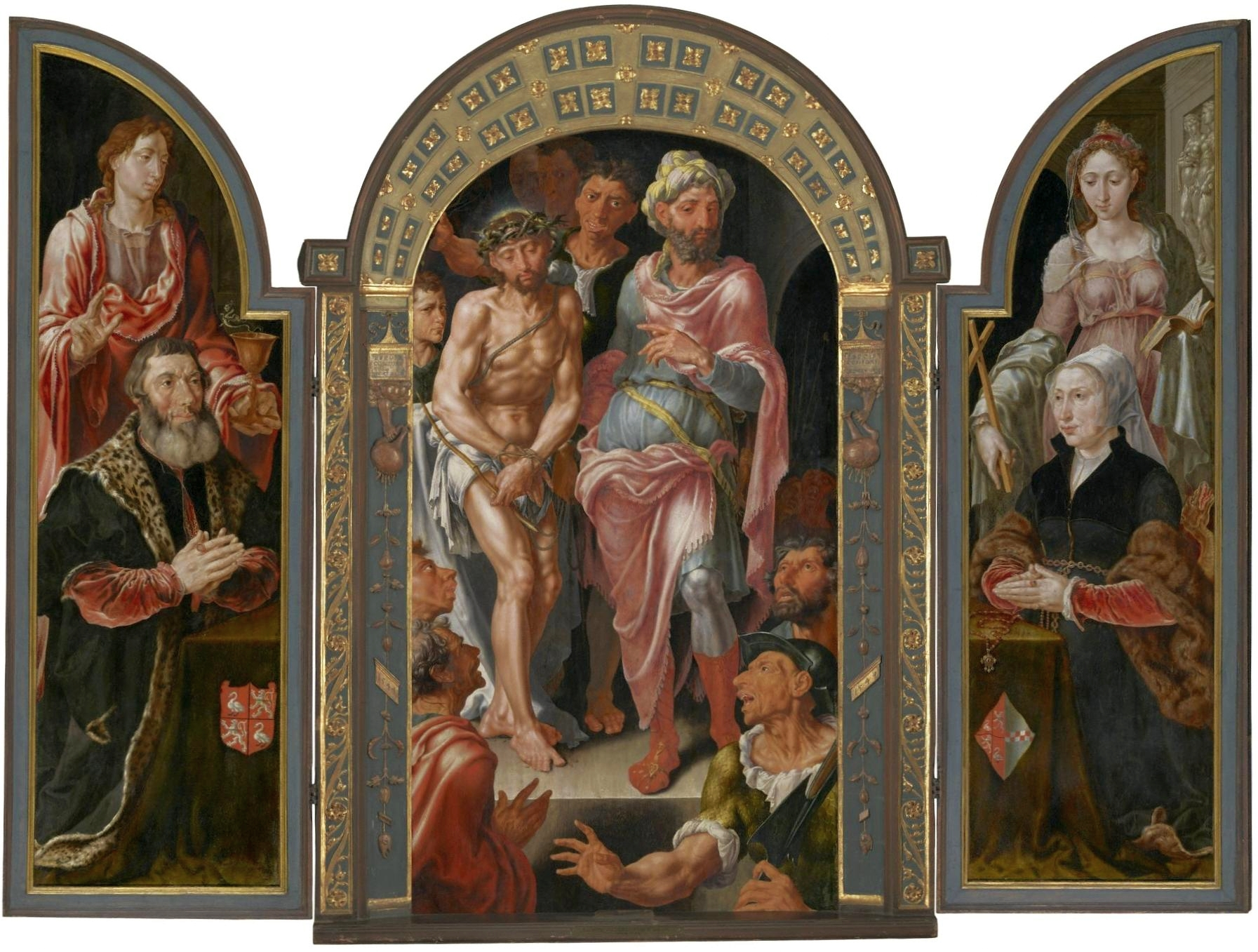
Ecce Homo Altarpiece, 1544. Now in National Museum in Warsaw.

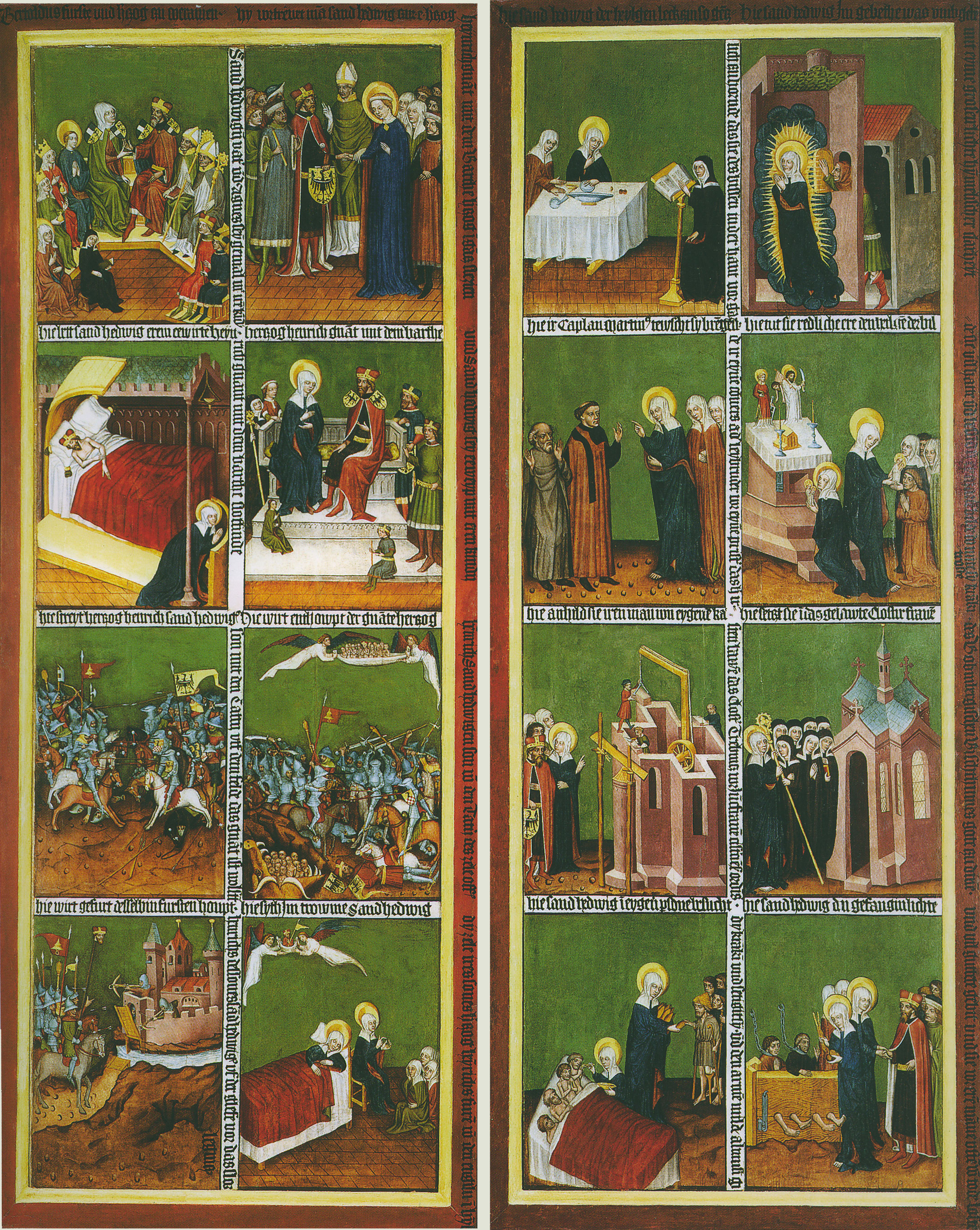
Saint Hedwig Altar. Now in National Museum in Warsaw.

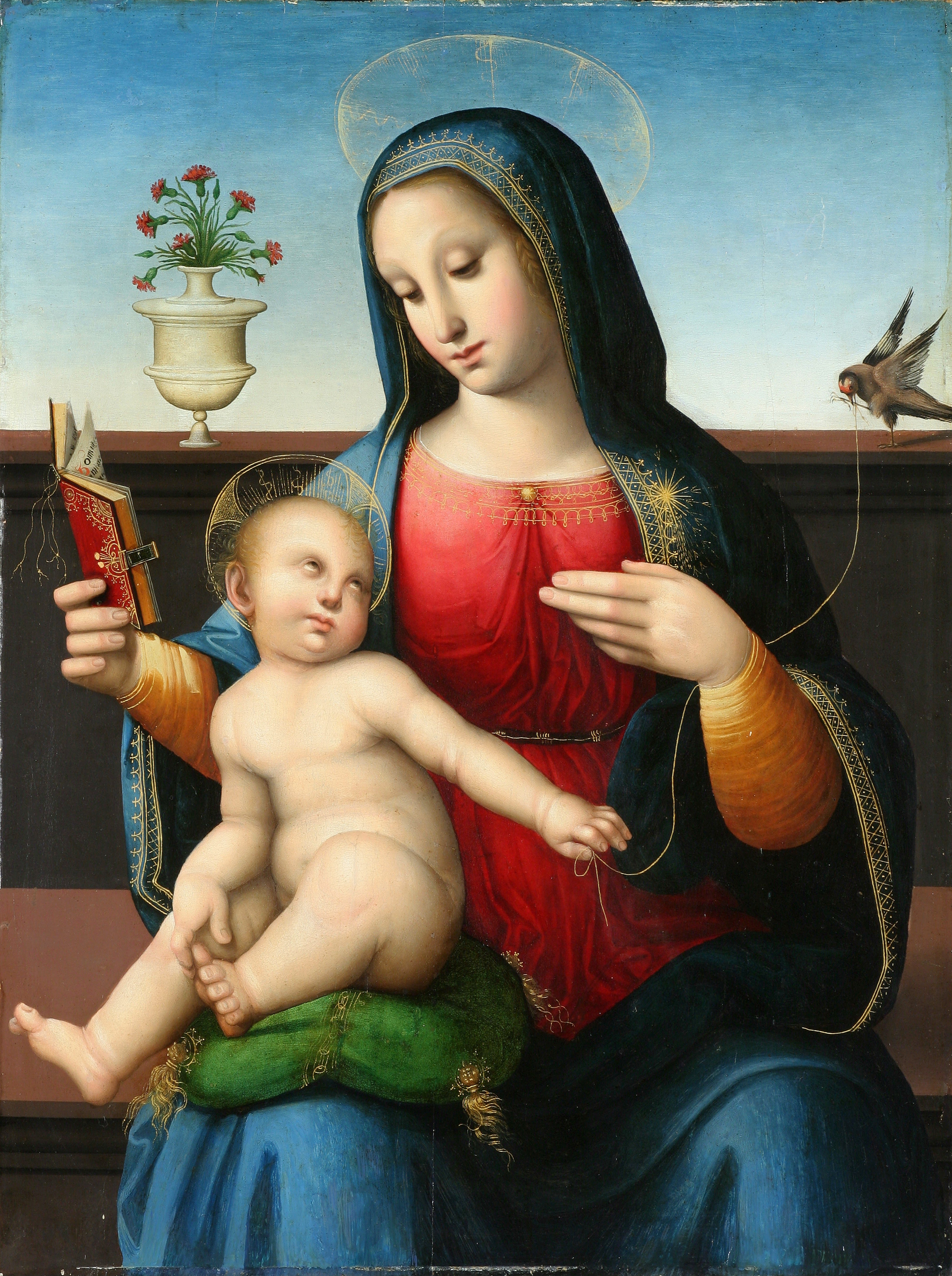
The Virgin and Child with a Goldfinch by Leonardo di Francesco di Lazzaro Malatesta, circa 1505. Now in National Museum in Wrocław.

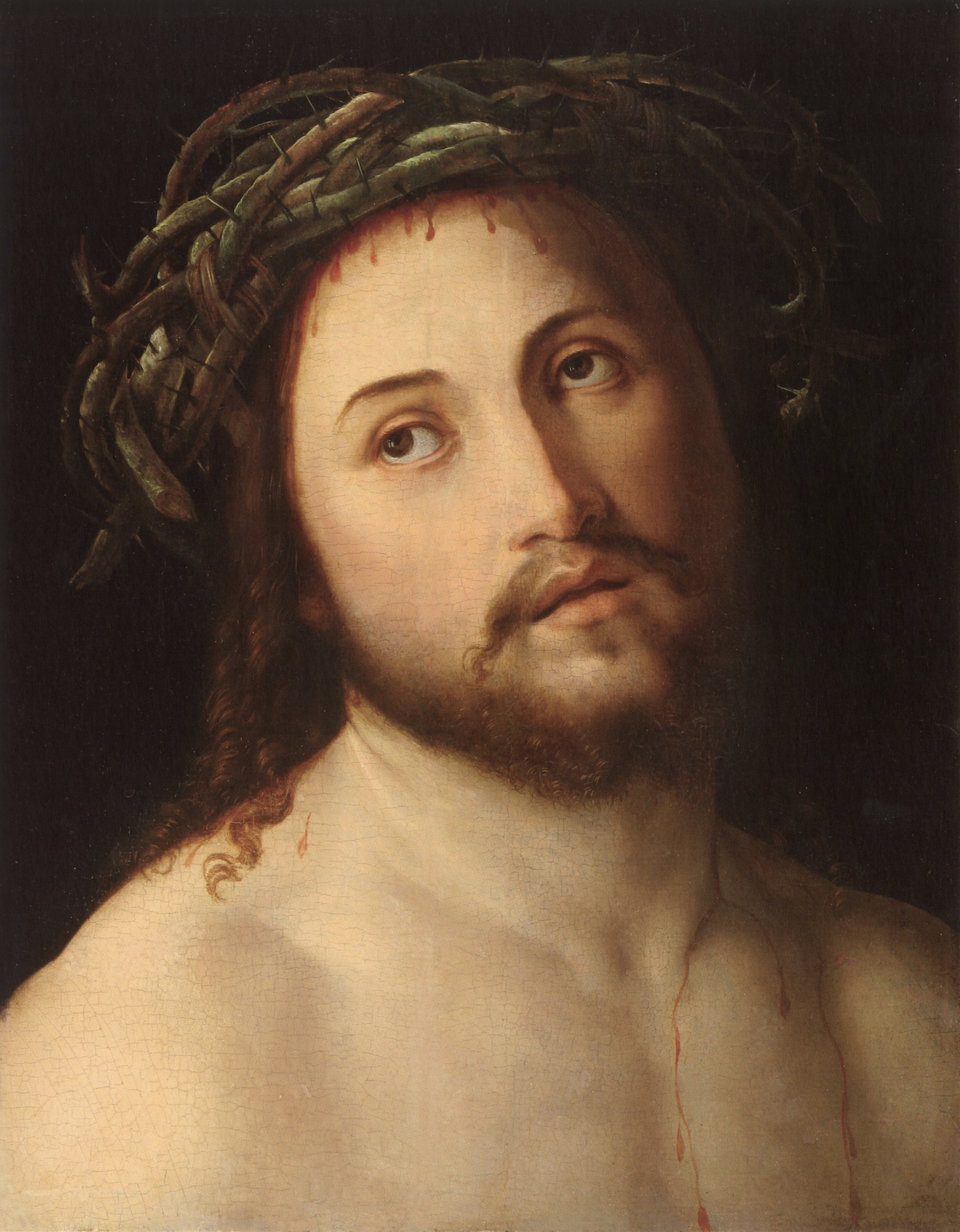
Christ in the Crown of Thorns by Georg Pencz, 1544. Now in National Museum in Wrocław.

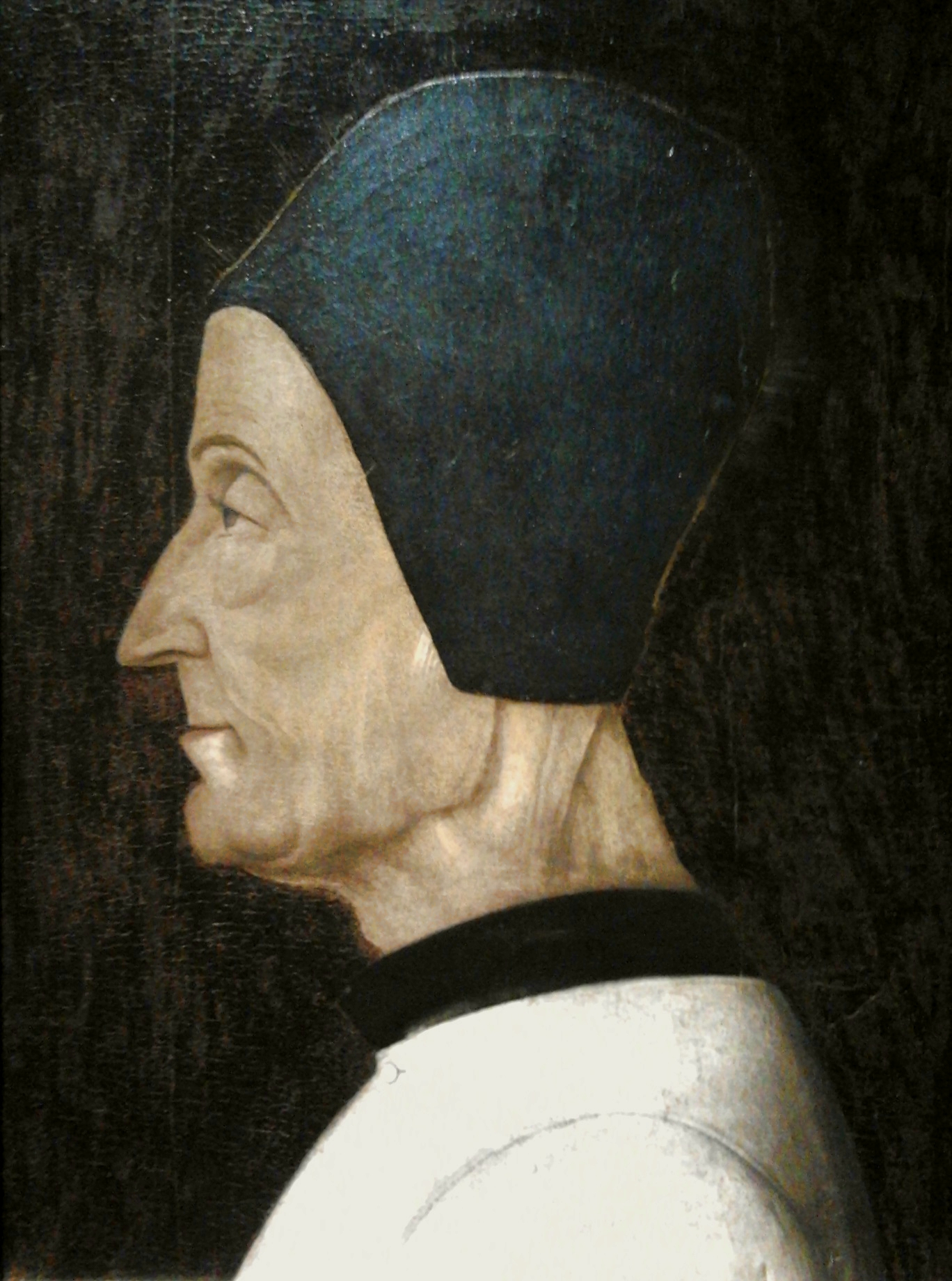
Portrait of Lorenzo Giustiniani by Gentile Bellini, 1465. Now in National Museum in Warsaw.

=== German and European art ===
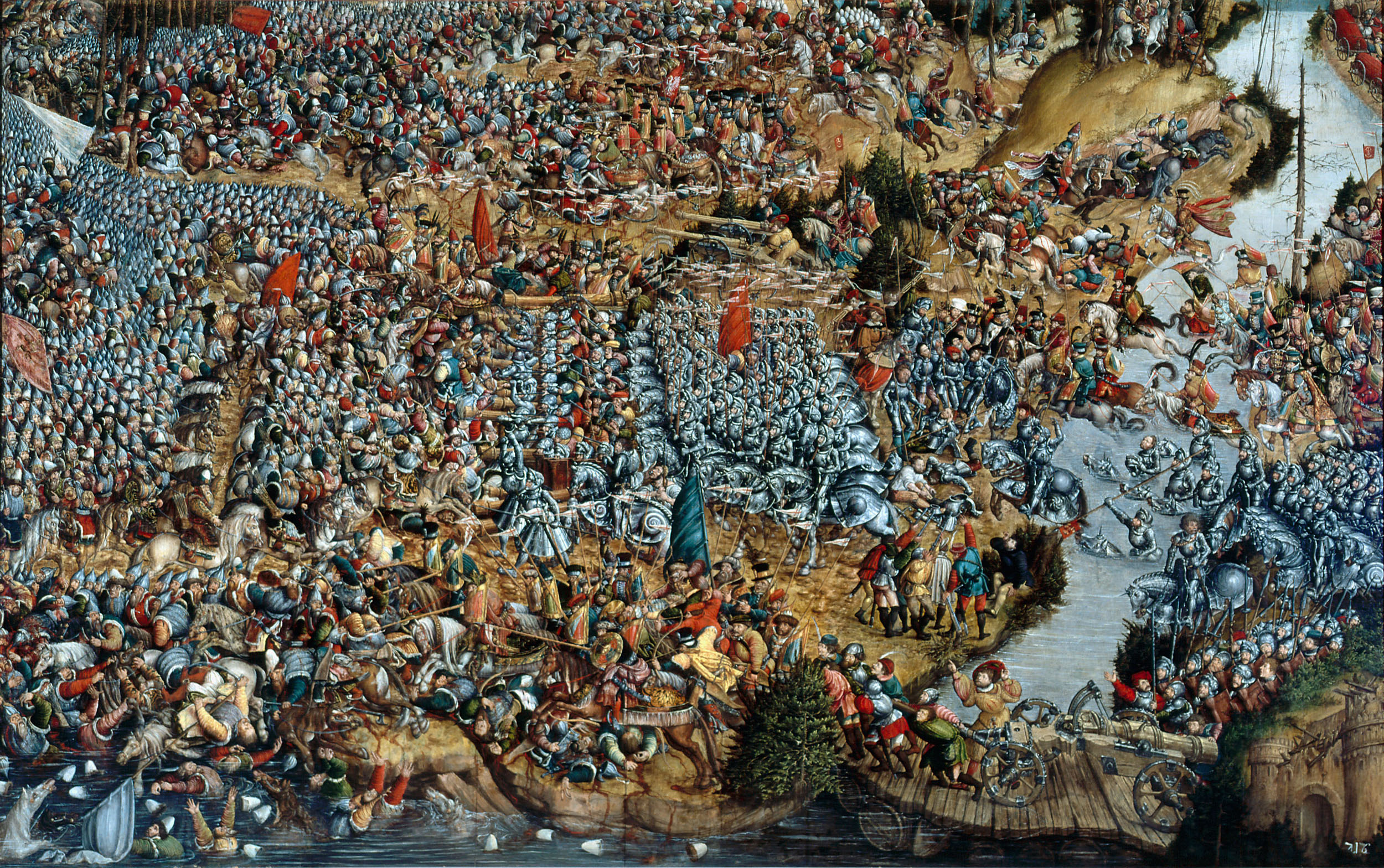
Battle of Orsha on 8 September 1514, by Hans Krell, 1524. Now in National Museum in Warsaw.

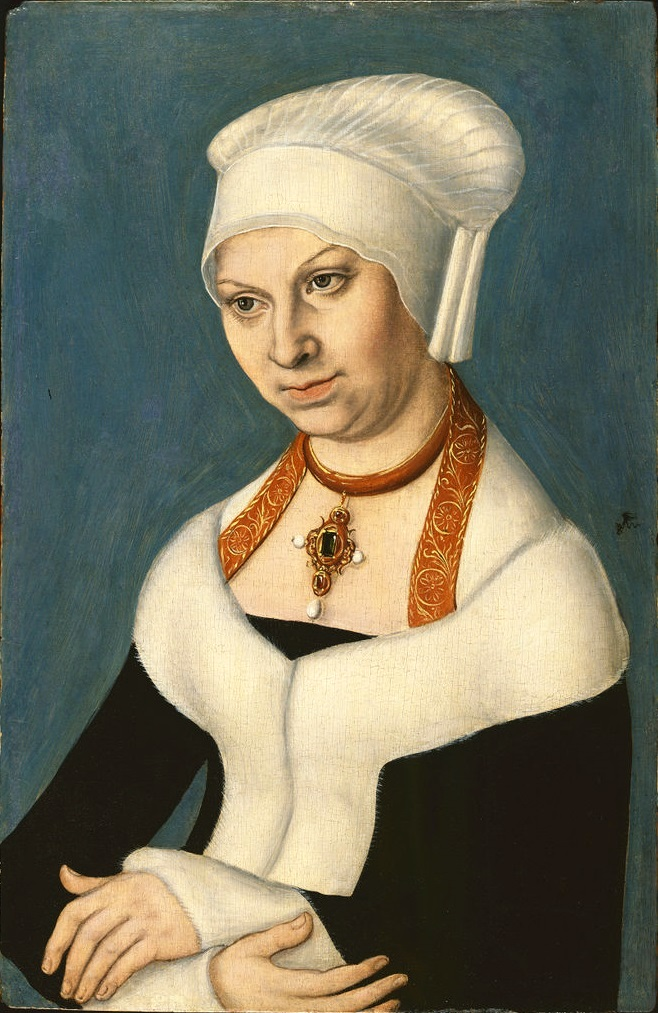
Portrait of Barbara Duchess of Saxony, by Lucas Cranach (I), 1537. Now in Gemäldegalerie Berlin.

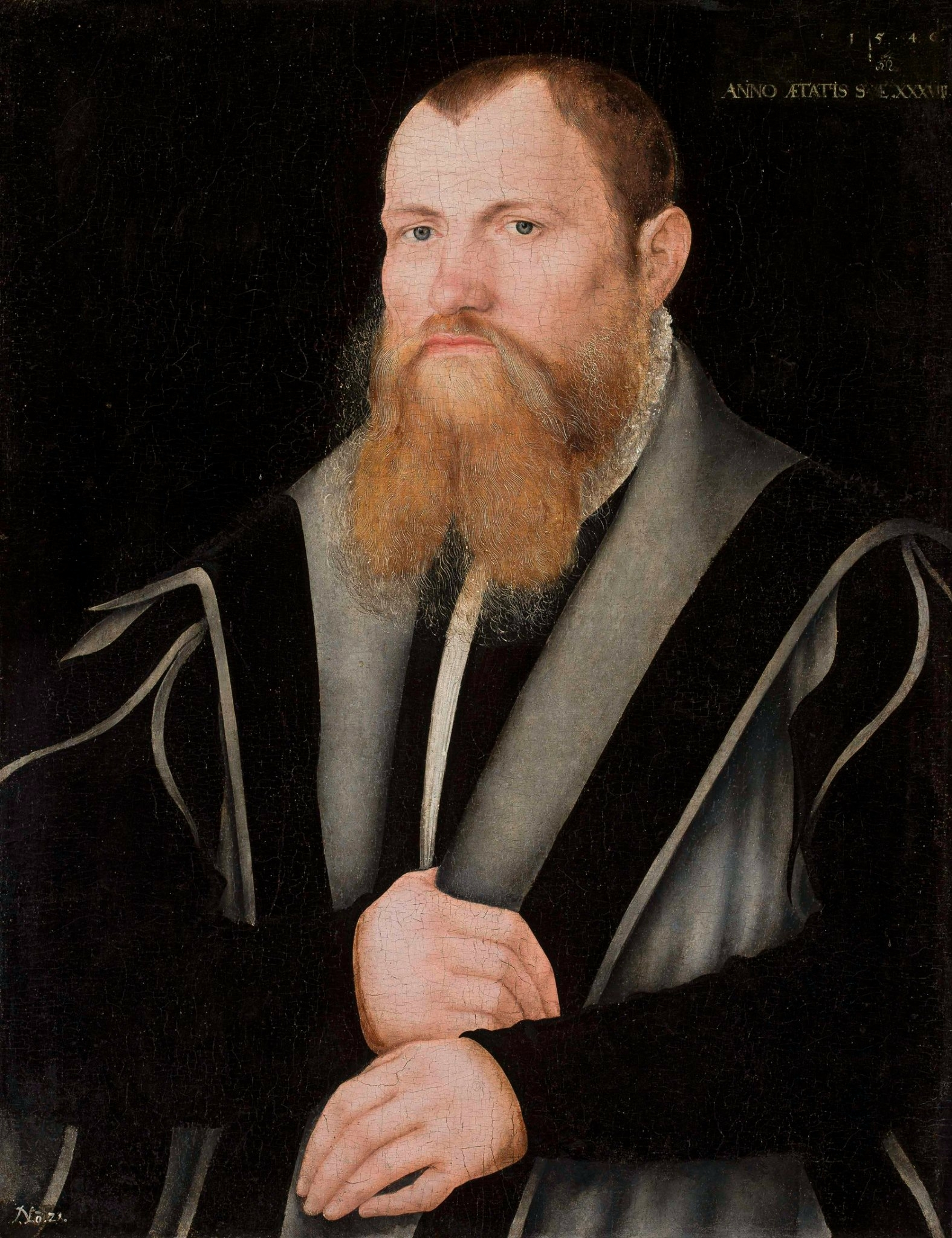
Portrait of a Bearded Man, Cranach the Younger, 1546. Now in National Museum in Warsaw.

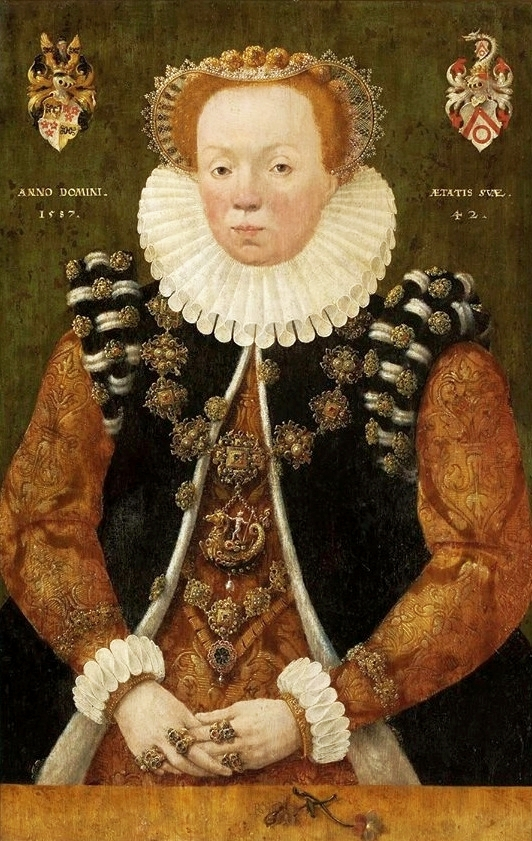
Portrait of Katharina von Hatzfeld by Hermann tom Ring, 1587. Now in National Museum in Warsaw.

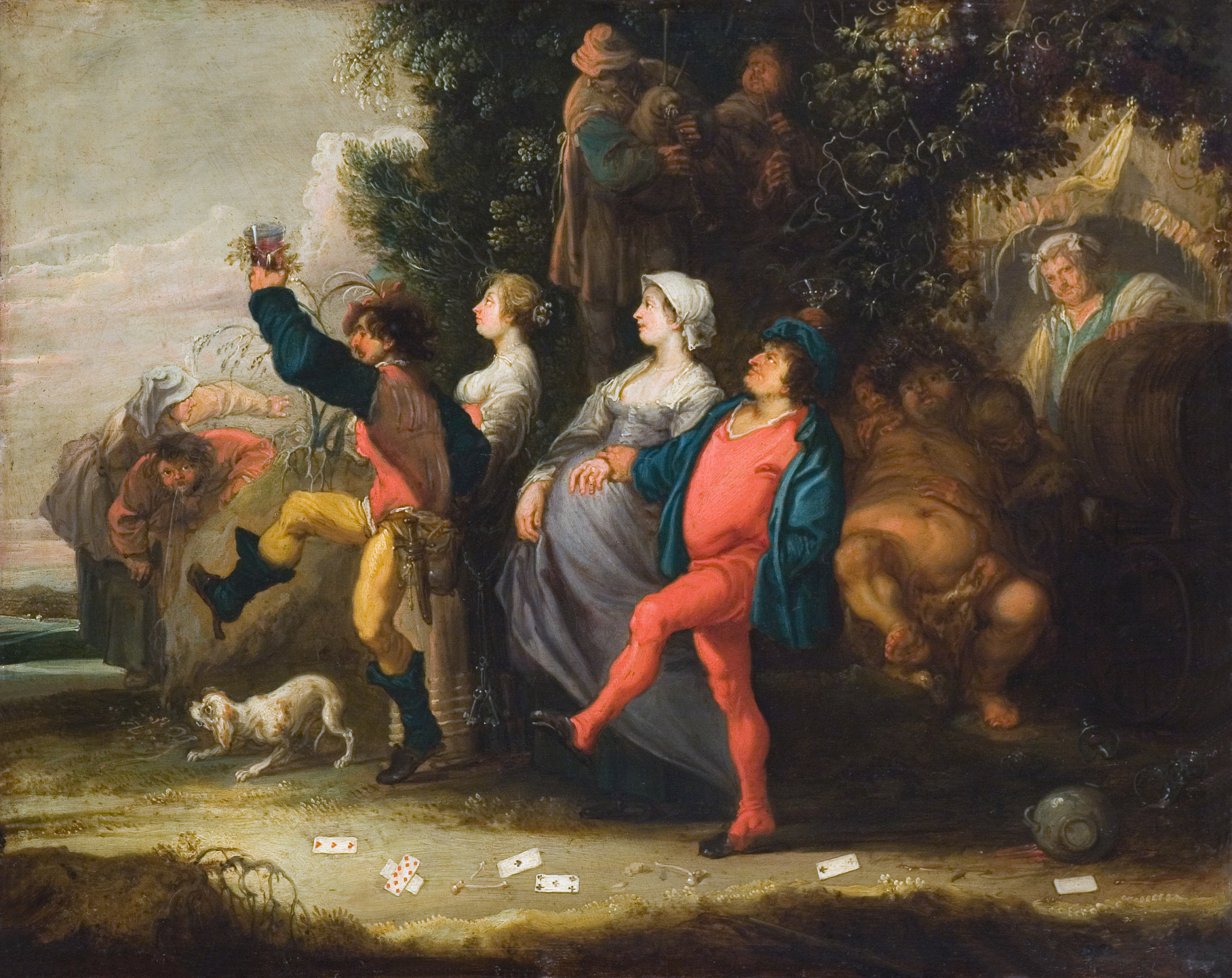
Village Procession by Simon de Vos, 1640. Now in National Museum in Wrocław.

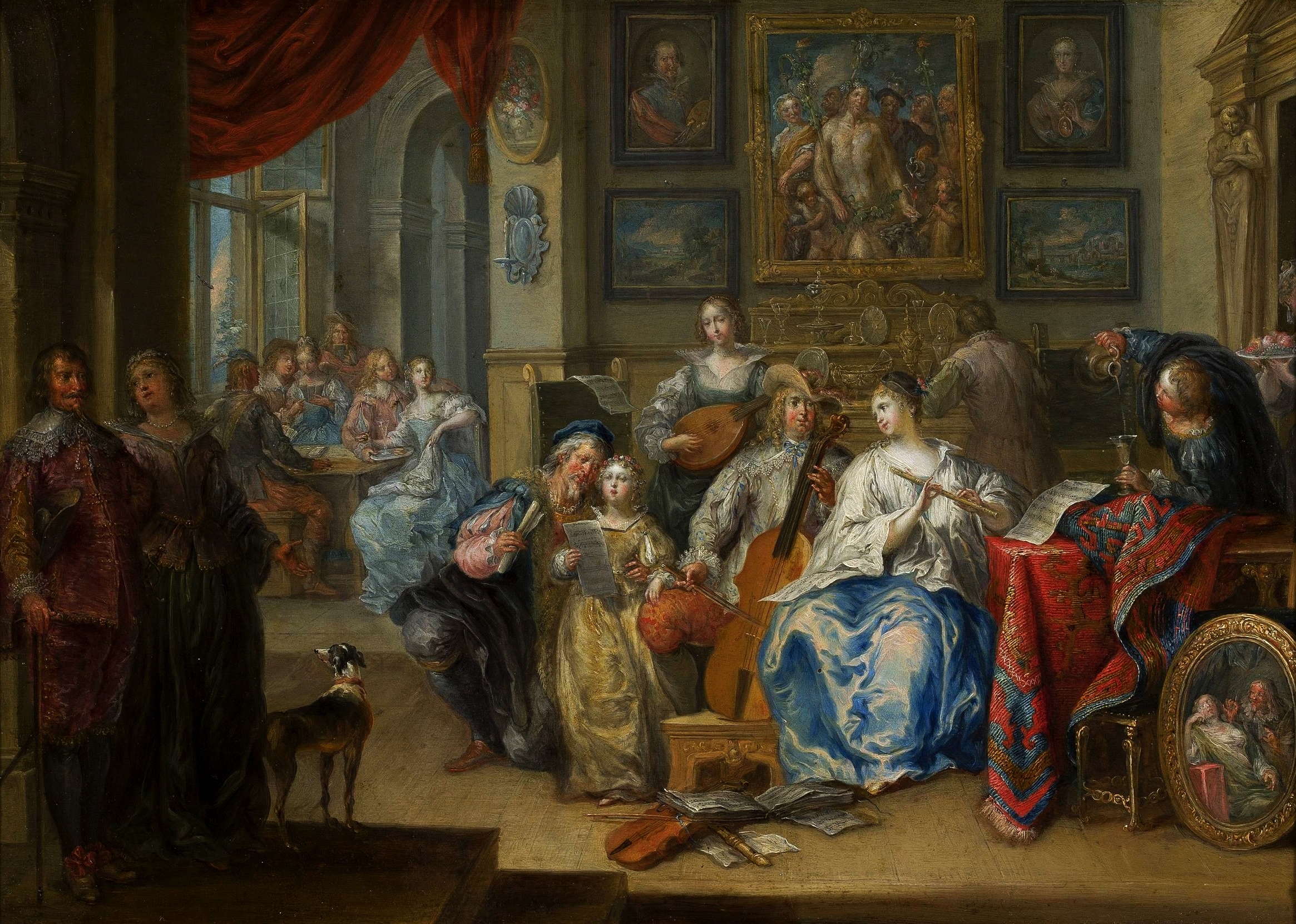
Johann Georg Platzer:
Das Konzert. Now in National Museum in Warsaw.

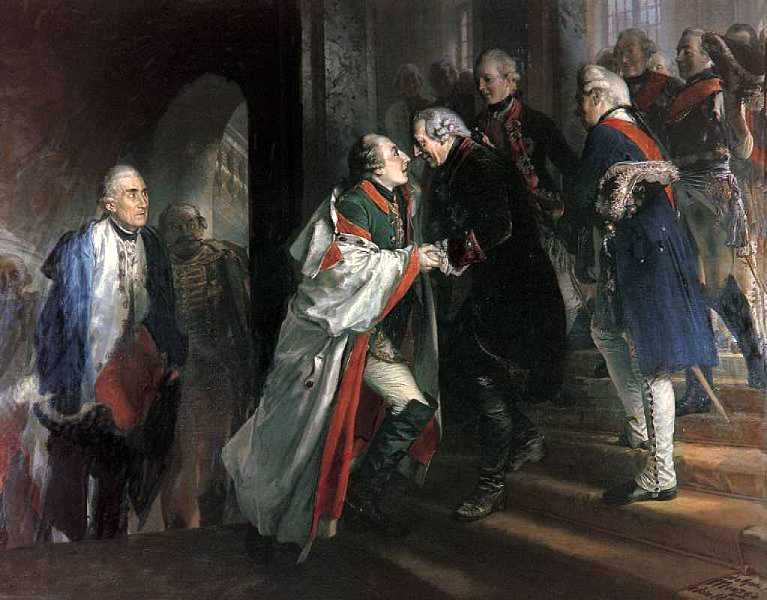
Adolph Menzel:
Zusammenkunft Friedrichs II. mit Kaiser Joseph II. im Jahr 1769 zu Neiße. Now in National Museum in Wrocław.

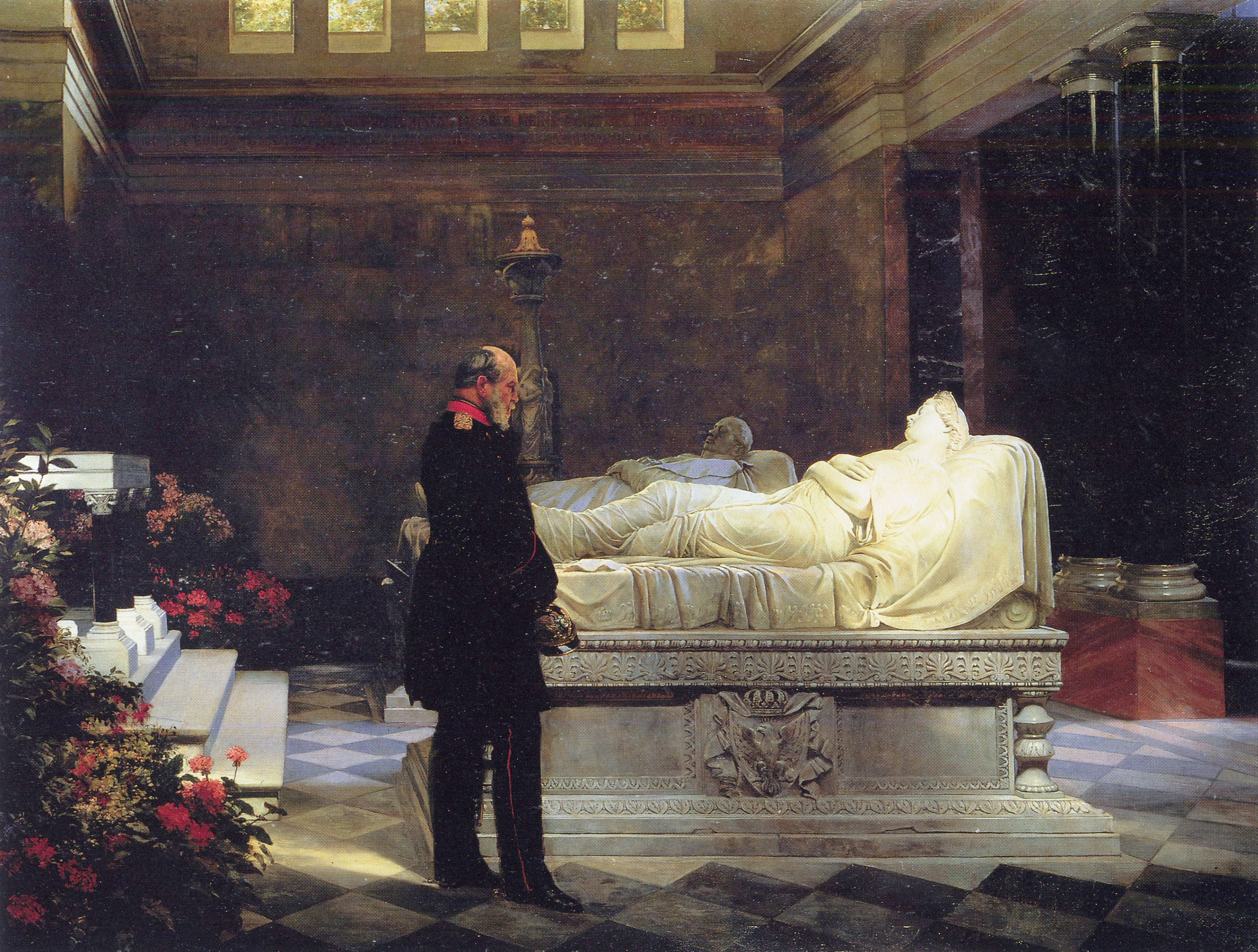
Anton von Werner:
Wilhelm I. am Sarkophag seiner Mutter Königin Luise (1870).

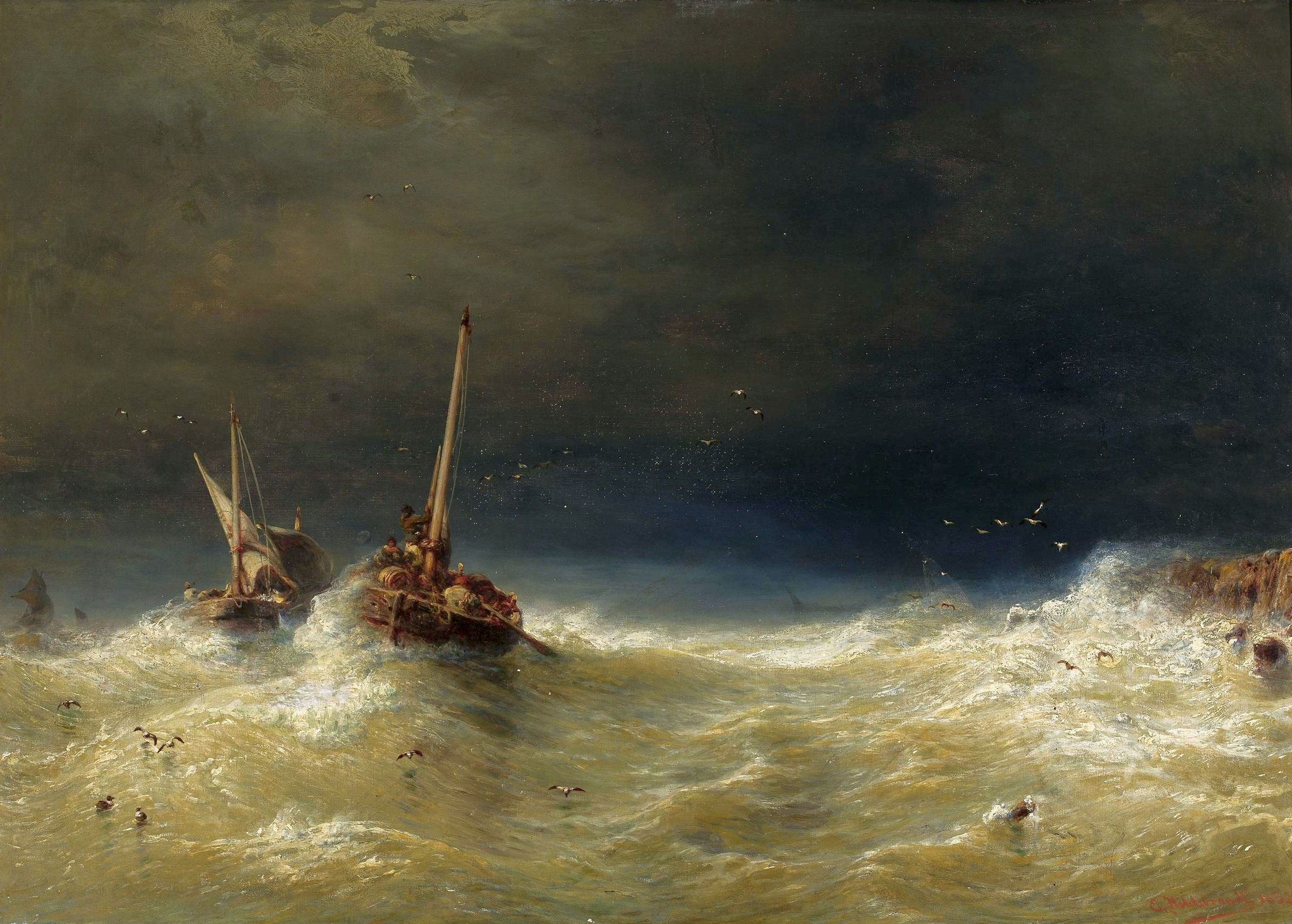
Sea Tempest by Eduard Hildebrandt, 1852. Now in National Museum in Warsaw.

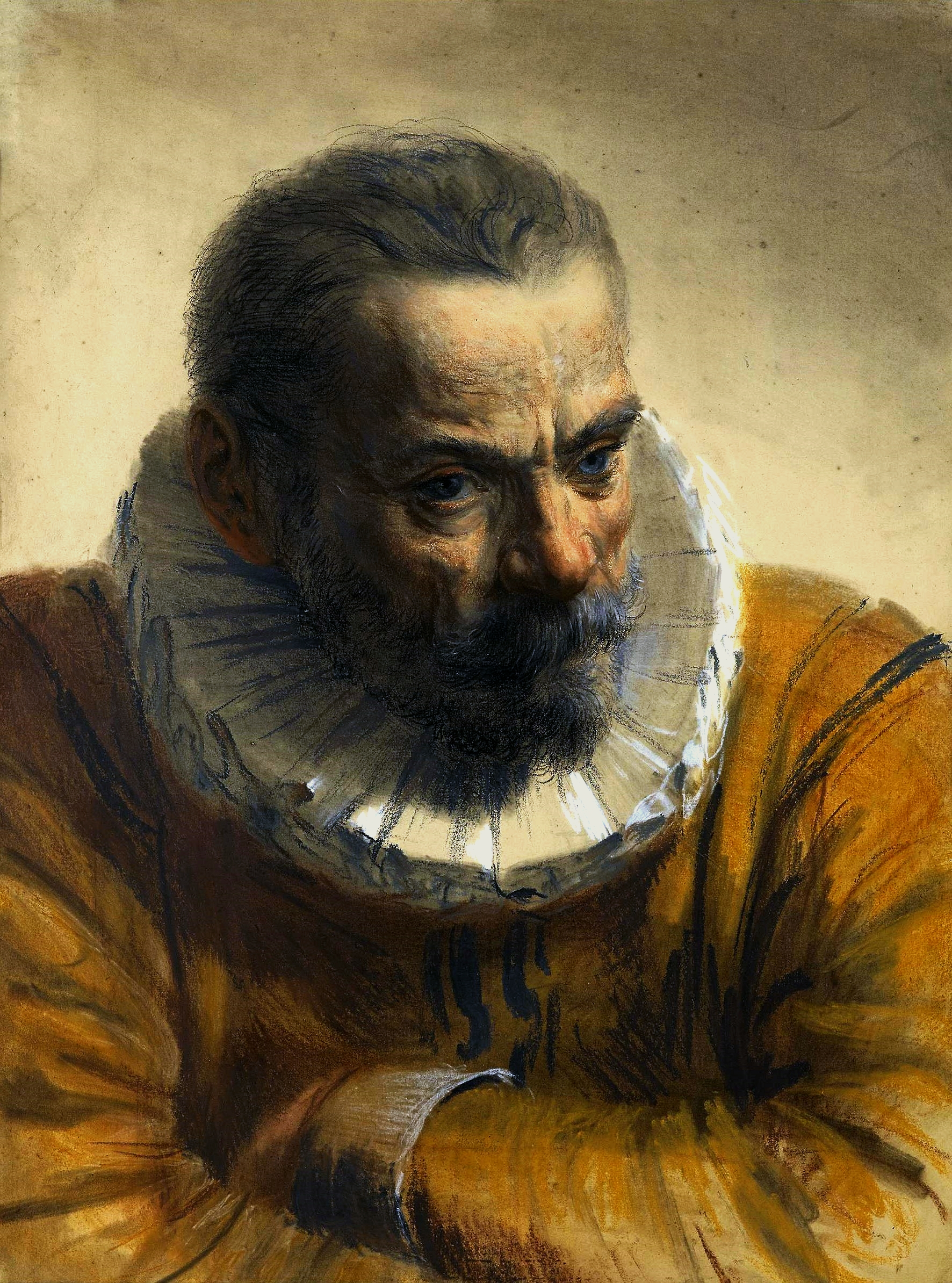
Study of a Man with a Ruff Collar by Adolph von Menzel, 1850. Now in National Museum in Warsaw.

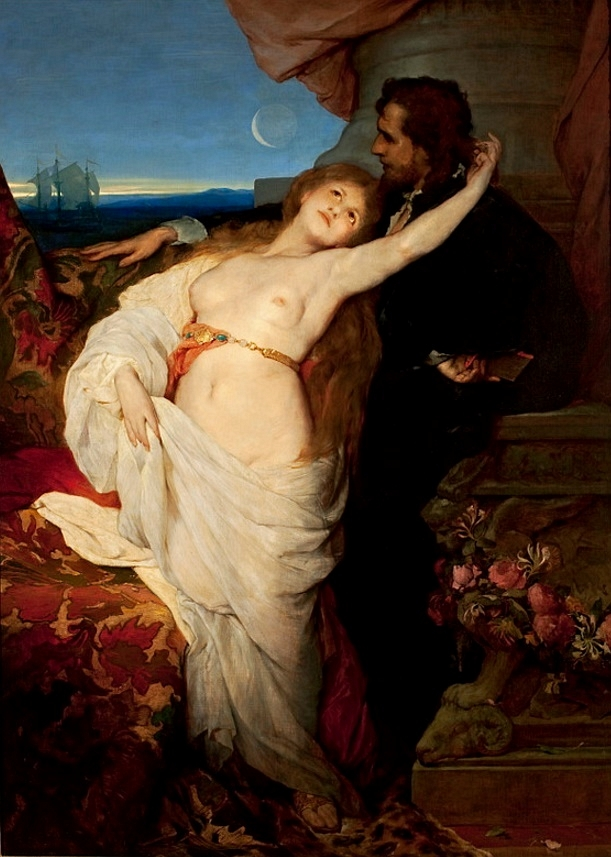
Tannhäuser by Gabriel von Max, 1878. Now in National Museum in Warsaw.

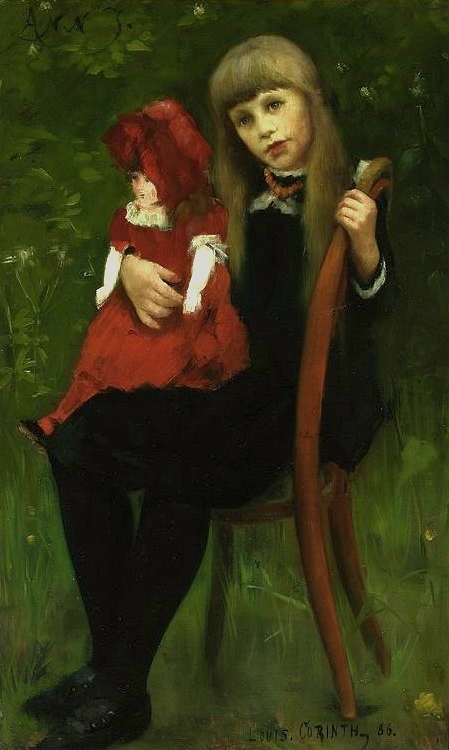
Lovis Corinth:
Anna Schaumberg mit einer Puppe (1886). Now in National Museum in Warsaw.

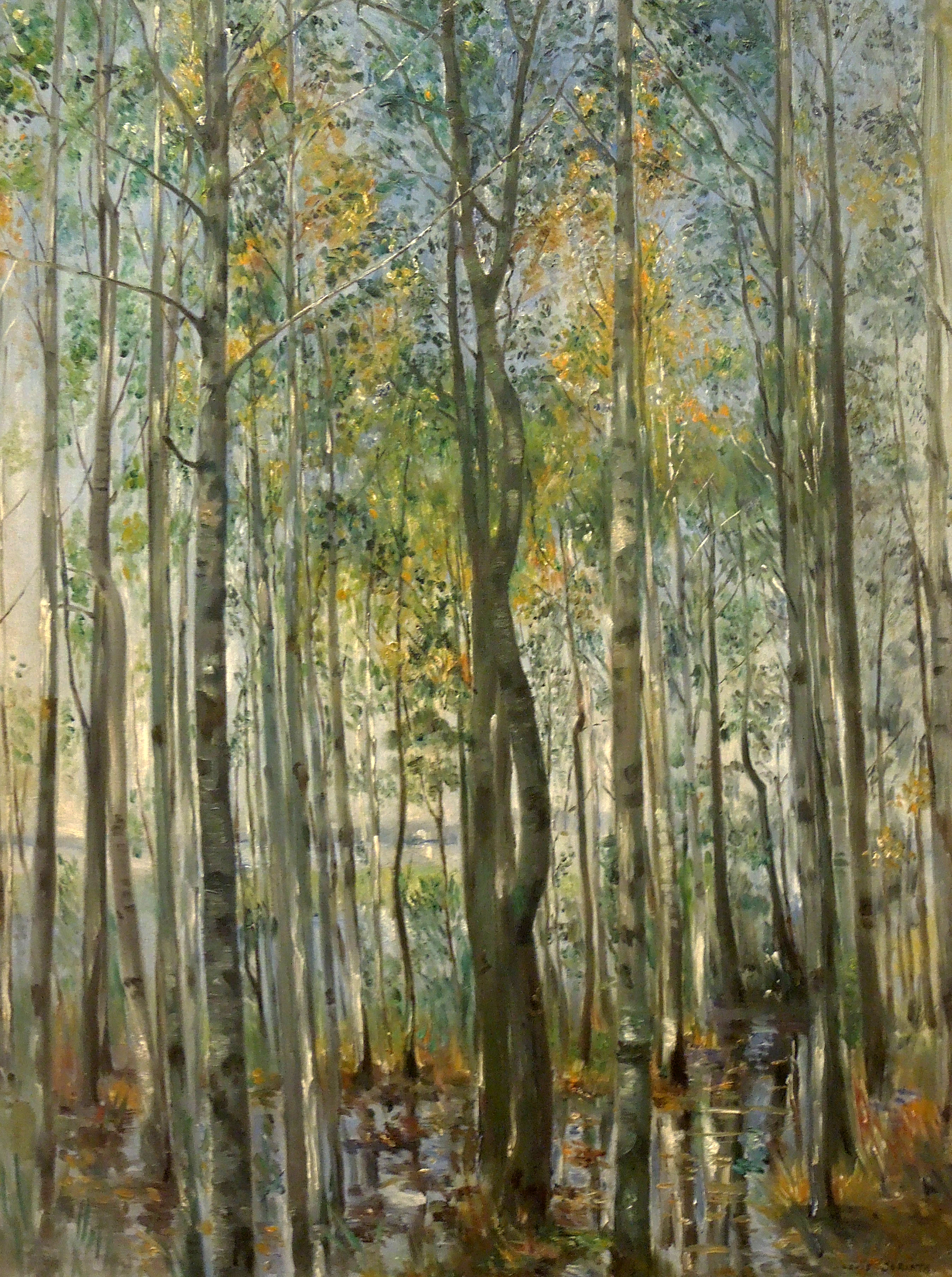
Lovis Corinth:
Am Starnberger See (1896). Now in National Museum in Wrocław.

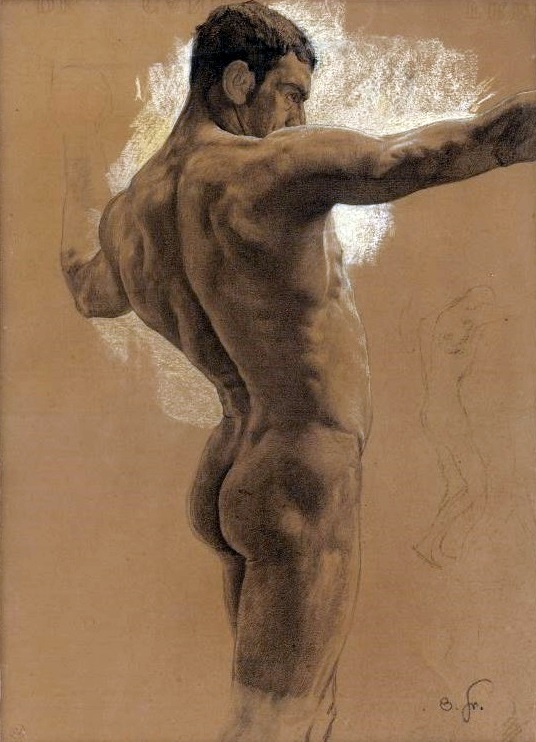
Male Nude by Otto Greiner, 1896. Now in National Museum in Warsaw.

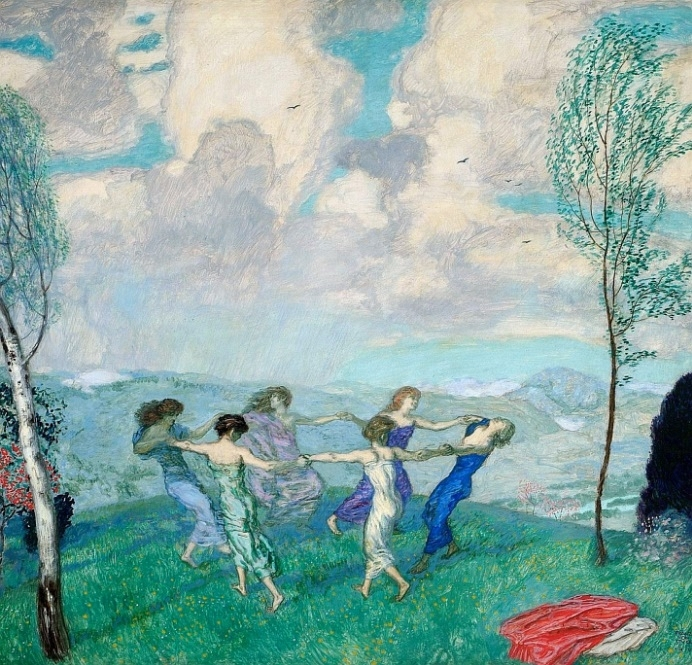
Dancing Circle by Franz Stuck, 1910. Now in National Museum in Warsaw.

== Literature ==
- Berg: Schlesisches Museum der Bildenden Künste. In: Amtliche Berichte aus den Königlichen Kunstsammlungen Band 2, Nr. 2, 1881, S. 13–15.
- Erich Wiese, Heinz Braune: Schlesisches Museum der Bildenden Künste Breslau. Katalog der Gemälde und Skulpturen. Breslau 1929.
- Zofia Bandurska: Archivalien der ehemaligen Breslauer Kunstmuseen. In: Berichte und Forschungen. Jahrbuch des Bundesinstituts für Kultur und Geschichte der Deutschen im östlichen Europa Band 12, 2004, S. 73–79.
- Diana Codogni-Łańcucka: Das Schlesische Museum der bildenden Künste in Breslau in der NS-Zeit. In: Tanja Baensch, Kristina Kratz-Kessemeier, Dorothee Wimmer (Hrsg.): Museen im Nationalsozialismus. Akteure – Orte – Politik, Böhlau, Köln u. a. 2016, ISBN 978-3-412-22408-0, S. 245–262.
