= Stolpersteine in Vysočina Region =

Memorial installations in Czech Republic

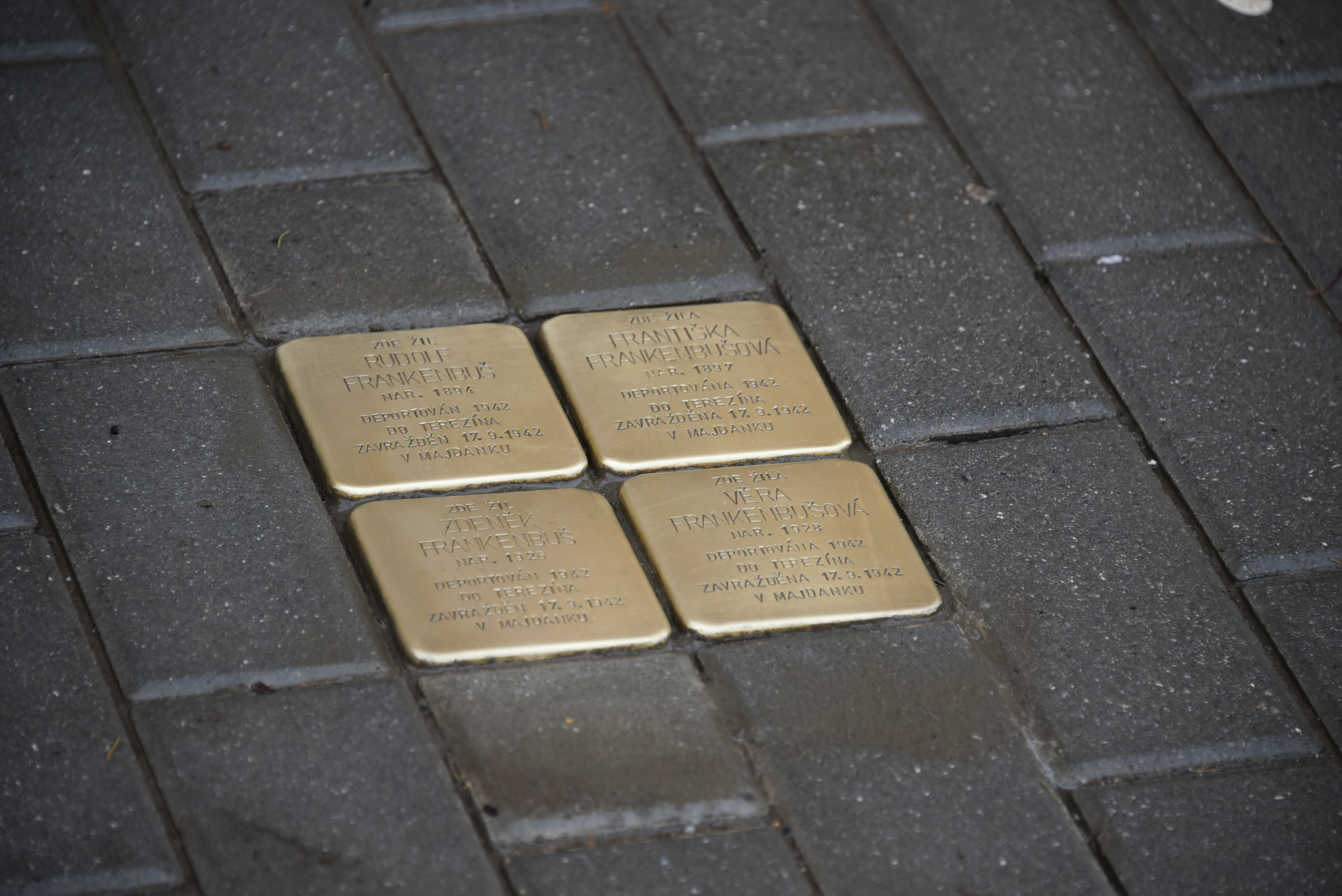
Stolpersteine for family Frankenbuš in Senožaty

This article lists the Stolpersteine in the Vysočina Region (IPA: [ˈvɪsotʃɪna]; Czech: Kraj Vysočina "Highlands Region") in the south-east of Bohemia. Stolpersteine is the German name for stumbling blocks collocated all over Europe by German artist Gunter Demnig. They remember the fate of the Nazi victims being murdered, deported, exiled or driven to suicide.

Generally, the stumbling blocks are posed in front of the building where the victims had their last self chosen residence. The name of the Stolpersteine in Czech is: Kameny zmizelých, stones of the disappeared.

The lists are sortable; the basic order follows the alphabet according to the last name of the victim.

== Chotěboř ==
Stone	Inscription	Location	Life and death
	HERE LIVED; MAYER MAX; SCHENKEL; BORN 1882; DEPORTED 1942; TO THERESIENSTADT; MURDERED 8.3.1944; IN AUSCHWITZ-BIRKENAU	Fominova 257; 49°43′07″N 15°40′10″E	Mayer Max Schenkel was born on 20 March 1882 in Tarnów. He and his wife founded a factory that manufactured plush toys in Chotěboř. He was married to Irma née Roubíčková. The couple had a son named Zdeněk, born in 1919. He and his family lived in a house in ul. Fominově 257 in Chotěboř. After the take-over of power by the Nazis, his house became an internment home for Jews. On 5 December 1942, Max Schenkel and his family were deported with transport Cf from Pardubice to Theresienstadt concentration camp. His transport number was 186 of 650. On 6 September 1943, the family was deported with transport Dl to Auschwitz concentration camp. His transport number was 1959 of 2484. On 8 March 1944, the SS decided to clear the so-called Familienlager BIIb [family camp] in Birkenau to have space for new incoming transports from Theresienstadt. During the same night, father, mother and son were gassed by the Nazi regime at Auschwitz-Birkenau, together with 3,788 other inmates.
	HERE LIVED; ZDENĚK SCHENKEL; BORN 1919; DEPORTED 1942; TO THERESIENSTADT; MURDERED 8.3.1944; IN AUSCHWITZ-BIRKENAU	Fominova 257; 49°43′07″N 15°40′10″E	Zdeněk Schenkel was born on 13 November 1919 in ul. Fominově 257 in Chotěboř. His parents were Mayer Max Schenkel and Irma née Roubíčková. He went to primary school and then to high school in his home town. He could not complete his studies. On 5 December 1942, the family was deported with transport Cf from Pardubice to Theresienstadt concentration camp. His transport number was 188 of 650. On 5 September 1943, the family was deported with transport Dl to Auschwitz concentration camp. His transport number was 1960 of 2484. On 8 March 1944, father, mother and son were murdered by the Nazi regime at Auschwitz-Birkenau when 3,791 former Theresienstadt inmates, all located at the so-called Familienlager BIIb [family camp] in Birkenau, were gassed within one night.
	HERE LIVED; IRMA SCHENKELOVÁ; BORN 1891; DEPORTED 1942; TO THERESIENSTADT; MURDERED 8.3.1944; IN AUSCHWITZ-BIRKENAU	Fominova 257; 49°43′07″N 15°40′10″E	Irma Schenkelová née Roubíčková was born on 2 May 1882 in Nasavrky. She was married to Mayer Max Schenkel. The couple had a son named Zdeněk, born in 1919. Irma and Max Schenkel ran a factory that manufactured plush toys in Chotěboř. They owned a house in ul. Fominově 257. On 5 December 1942, the family was deported with transport Cf from Pardubice to Theresienstadt concentration camp. Her transport number was 187 of 650. On 5 September 1943, the family was deported with transport Dl to Auschwitz concentration camp. Her transport number was 1957 of 2484. On 8 March 1944, father, mother and son were murdered by the Nazi regime at Auschwitz-Birkenau when 3,791 former Theresienstadt inmates, all from the so-called Familienlager BIIb [family camp] in Birkenau, were gassed within one night.

The names of all three victims of the Schenkel family can also be found on a monument for the victims of WW2 located in the Krále Jana, the King John park in the center of Chotěboř.

== Havlíčkův Brod ==
Stone	Inscription	Location	Life and death
	HERE LIVED; PAVEL PACHNER; BORN 1876; DEPORTED 1942; TO THERESIENSTADT; TO SOBIBOR 1942; MURDERED	Dolni 104; 49°36′19″N 15°34′48″E	Pavel Pachner was born on 20 February 1876 in Havlíčkův Brod, then called Německý Brod [German Brod], where he also attended high school. He lived with his wife Ida in his home town. The couple had two daughters: Zdeňka (born 13 March 1904) and Hana (born 12 February 1908) and he became a successful and respected businessman. First he took over his father's drugstore U cerného psa [At the Black Dog]. He also ran a photography shop and a gas station. After the death of his brother Oskar in 1937, he inherited the house in the Dolni 104 as well as the wine and liquor store located there. In 1939, Pavel and Ida were expropriated by the Nazi regime and forced to move to Prague. On 7 May 1942, the couple was arrested and deported with transport At to Theresienstadt concentration camp. Pavel Pachner and his wife were finally transferred to Sobibor extermination camp on 9 May 1942 and murdered by the Nazi regime. Both daughters were deported to Theresienstadt in 1944, both survived.
	HERE LIVED; IDA PACHNEROVÁ; BORN 1876; DEPORTED 1942; TO THERESIENSTADT; TO SOBIBOR 1942; MURDERED	Dolni 104; 49°36′19″N 15°34′48″E	Ida Pachnerová née Morgenstern was born on 27 June 1876 in Prague. She married Pavel Pachner and the couple lived in Havlíčkův Brod. The couple had two daughters: Zdeňka (born on 13 March 1904) and Hana (born on 12 February 1908). In 1939, Pavel and Ida were expropriated and forced to move to Prague. On May 7, 1942, the couple were arrested and deported to Theresienstadt concentration camp by transport At, and finally transferred to the Sobibor extermination camp on May 9, 1942. There both were murdered by the Nazi regime. Both daughters were deported to Theresienstadt in 1944, both survived.

== Jihlava ==
Stone	Inscription	Location	Life and death
	HERE LIVED; ABRAHAM ADOLF; BERNSTEIN; BORN 1884; DEPORTED 1942; TO THERESIENSTADT; MURDERED 16.10.1944; IN AUSCHWITZ-BIRKENAU	Mahlerova 1904/4; 49.395295°N 15.581095°E	Abraham Adolf Bernstein was born on 23 March 1884. He was married to Ema Bernsteinová. The couple had at least one daughter and one son. The daughter's name was Elly (born 1917). The family had to leave their house in Jihlava. They moved to Telč. On 18 May 1942, they were deported from Třebíč by transport Av to Theresienstadt concentration camp. Abraham Adolf Bernstein's transport number was 655. On 16 October 1944, he and his wife were deported by transport Er to Auschwitz concentration camp. His transport number was 168. Abraham Adolf Bernstein and his wife were murdered there on the day of their arrival in a gas chamber. His daughter Elly survived. Ludvik Bernstein, presumably his son, born in 1915, is mentioned on a plaque in the high school of Jihlava. Ludvik Bernstein was deported from Prague to Theresienstadt in 1941, and from there to Riga in 1942. There he was murdered.
	HERE LIVED; EMA BERNSTEINOVÀ; NÉE MORGENSTERNOVÁ; BORN 1887; DEPORTED 1942; TO THERESIENSTADT; MURDERED 16.10.1944; IN AUSCHWITZ-BIRKENAU	Mahlerova 1904/4; 49.395295°N 15.581095°E	Ema Bernsteinová née Morgensternová was born on 21 June 1887. She was married to Abraham Adolf Bernstein. The couple had at least one daughter and one son. The daughter's name was Elly (born 1917). The family had to leave their house in Jihlava. They moved to Telč. On 18 May 1942, they were deported from Třebíč by transport Av to Theresienstadt concentration camp. Ema Bernsteinová's transport number was 656. On 16 October 1944, she and her husband were deported by transport Er to Auschwitz concentration camp. Her transport number was 169. Ema Bernsteinová and her husband were murdered in a gas chamber the same day. Her daughter Elly survived. Ludvik Bernstein, presumably her son, born in 1915, is mentioned on a plaque in the high school of Jihlava. Ludvik Bernstein was deported from Prague to Theresienstadt in 1941, and from there to Riga in 1942. There he was murdered.
	HERE LIVED; ELLY PORGESOVÁ; NÉE BERNSTEINOVÀ; BORN 1917; DEPORTED 1942; TO THERESIENSTADT; LIBERATED	Mahlerova 1904/4; 49.395295°N 15.581095°E	Elly Porgesová née Bernsteinová was born on 7 September 1917. Her parents were Abraham Adolf Bernstein and Ema née Morgensternová. She had at least one brother. The family had to leave their house in Jihlava. They moved to Telč. On 18 May 1942, they were deported from Třebíč by transport Av to Theresienstadt concentration camp. In Terezín, Elly Bernsteinová played a starring role in a cabaret called "Smejte se s námi" (Laugh with us). One of the authors of the play was Dr. Felix Porges. Actress and author fell in love with each other, and in 1943 there was a wedding in the camp. Both could survive the Nazi rule. After the liberation they decided to stay in the newly erected Czechoslovak Republic but they changed their name to Prokeš as they did not want to be recognized as Jews. They become parents of three sons. All three got Czech names, Zdeněk, Jan and Miroslav, and they were all baptized and registered as Catholics. Elly Porgesová died in 1975, her husband in 1982.

== Pacov ==
Stone	Inscription	Location	Life and death
	HERE LIVED; VIKTOR WEINER; BORN 1875; DEPORTED 1943; TO THERESIENSTADT; MURDERED 16.7.1943; IBIDEM	Španovského 172; 49°28′20″N 15°00′08″E	Viktor Weiner was born on 15 January 1875. He was married to Marie Weinerová née Langer. The couple had two children: Elsa (also Eliska, born 1914 or 1915) and Hana (born 1919). In Pacov he was the owner of a small leather goods factory, where wallets, bags and suitcases were manufactured. The factory burned down, and Viktor Weiner had to take out a large mortgage. In 1942, his wife and children were deported to Theresienstadt concentration camp. On 5 July 1943, he was deported too to Theresienstadt (his transport number was 598), On 16 July 1943, he was murdered here. His wife and his daughters were brought to death in Auschwitz concentration camp.
	HERE LIVED; ELSA WEINEROVÁ; BORN 1915; DEPORTED 1942; TO THERESIENSTADT; TO AUSCHWITZ 1943; MURDERED	Španovského 172; 49°28′20″N 15°00′08″E	Elsa Weinerová, also Eliska, was born in 1914 or 1915 in Pacov. While on the Stolperstein 1915 is engraved, Yad Vashem and Holocaust.cz report the 16 November 1914 as day of her birth. Her parents were Viktor and Marie Weiner. Her father was owner of a small leather factory, Elsa also worked here. On 16 November 1942, she, her sister Hana and her mother were deported from Tábor to Theresienstadt concentration camp by transport Cb (their number on the transport was 116). She was transferred to Auschwitz concentration camp on 6 September 1943 by transport Dl (her number on the transport was 2334), where she lived in the so-called Familienlager [family camp]. In the night of 8th to 9 March 1944 all inmates of this camp were gassed. Her father had also been deported to Theresienstadt. He had arrived there on 5 July 1943 and was murdered eleven days thereafter.
	HERE LIVED; HANA WEINEROVÁ; BORN 1919; DEPORTED 1942; TO THERESIENSTADT; TO AUSCHWITZ 1943; MURDERED	Španovského 172; 49°28′20″N 15°00′08″E	Hana Weinerová was born on 4 or 24 February 1919 in Pacov. Her parents were Viktor and Marie Weiner. Her father was owner of a small leather factory, Hana also worked here. On 16 November 1942, she, her sister Elsa and her mother were deported from Tábor to Theresienstadt concentration camp by transport Cb (their number on the transport was 117). She was transferred to Auschwitz concentration camp on 6 September 1943 by transport Dl (her number on the transport was 2335), where they lived in the so-called Familienlager [family camp]. In the night of 8th to 9 March 1944 all inmates of this camp were gassed. Her father had also been deported to Theresienstadt. He had arrived there on 5 July 1943 and was murdered eleven days thereafter.
	HERE LIVED; MARIE WEINEROVÁ; BORN 1888; DEPORTED 1942; TO THERESIENSTADT; TO AUSCHWITZ 1943; MURDERED	Španovského 172; 49°28′20″N 15°00′08″E	Marie Weinerová née Langer was born on 5 April 1888. She was married to Viktor Weiner. The couple had two daughters, Eliska and Hana. On 16 November 1942 she was deported together with her two daughters with transport Cb from Tábor to Theresienstadt concentration camp (her number on the transport was 115 of 619). Marie, Eliska and Hana Weinerová were transferred to Auschwitz concentration camp on 6 September 1943 by transport Dl (her number on the transport was 2333 of 2484), where they lived in the so-called Familienlager [family camp]. In the night of 8th to 9 March 1944 all inmates of this camp were gassed. Her husband, Viktor Weiner, was deported to Theresienstadt in July 1943, where he was murdered on July 16, 1943.

== Senožaty ==
Stone	Inscription	Location	Life and death
	HERE LIVED; RUDOLF; FRANKENBUŠ; BORN 1894; DEPORTED 1942; TO THERESIENSTADT; MURDERED 17.9.1942; IN MAJDANEK	Senožaty 82; 49°34′09″N 15°11′58″E	Rudolf Frankenbuš, also Frankenbusch, was born on 25 March 1894. He was married to Františka Frankenbušová, the couple had two children, Zdeněk (born 1926) and Vera (born 1928). After the death of his father-in-law in 1924, he took over his grocery, which he extended and expanded into a general store. On 13 June 1942, he and his family were deported from Kolín to Theresienstadt concentration camp by the transport AAd (his number on the transport was 636). When the train arrived at the station of Bohušovice, he was immediately taken to a waiting train and transported to Majdanek concentration camp with transport AAi (his number on this transport was 921). There he had to work as a forced labourer. On 17 September 1942, Rudolf Frankenbusch was murdered in Majdanek by the Nazi regime.
	HERE LIVED; ZDENĚK; FRANKENBUŠ; BORN 1926; DEPORTED 1942; TO THERESIENSTADT; MURDERED 17.9.1942; IN MAJDANEK	Senožaty 82; 49°34′09″N 15°11′58″E	Zdeněk Frankenbuš, also Frankenbusch, was born on 8 January 1926. His parents were Rudolf Frankenbuš and Františka née Herrmann. His father ran a general store in Senožaty. On 13 June 1942, he and his family were deported from Kolín to Theresienstadt concentration camp by transport AAd (his number on the transport was 639). When the train arrived at the station of Bohušovice, he and his family were immediately taken to a waiting train and transported towards east with transport AAi (his number on this transport was 971). This train was later known as the Lost Train of Kolín as we still don't know where it was headed to. But it has been proven the none of the 1,000 Jews on this train could survive the Shoah. His father was brought to Majdanek concentration camp, had to do forced labour and died there on 17 September 1942. The inscription on the Stolperstein indicates, that also Zdeněk Frankenbuš was murdered that same day. This appears to be unsecured due to the sources. Zdeněk Frankenbusch did not survive the Shoah, neither his mother or his sister.
	HERE LIVED; FRANTIŠKA; FRANKENBUŠOVÁ; BORN 1897; DEPORTED 1942; TO THERESIENSTADT; MURDERED 17.9.1942; IN MAJDANEK	Senožaty 82; 49°34′09″N 15°11′58″E	Františka Frankenbušová, also Frankenbuschová, née Herrmann was born on 22 September 1897. She was married to Rudolf Frankenbusch. The couple had two children, Zdeněk (born 1926) and Vera (born 1928). Her father died in 1924 and left his grocery to her husband. On 13 June 1942, she was deported from Kolín to Theresienstadt concentration camp by transport AAd — together with her husband and her children. Her transport number was 637. When the train arrived at the station of Bohušovice nad Ohří, she and her family were immediately taken to another train, transport AAi. Her transport number was 969. This train became later known as the Lost Train of Kolín. It was directed to the east, probably to Sobibor extermination camp, and none of the 1,000 Jews on the train survived. It is known that her husband was transported to Majdanek concentration camp to do forced labour. He was murdered there on 17 September 1942. The inscription on the Stolperstein indicates, that also Františka Frankenbuschová was killed on 17 September 1942 in Majdanek. This has not been proven by the available sources till now. Františka Frankenbuschová did not survive the Shoah. Also her children were murdered by the Nazi regime.
	HERE LIVED; VĚRA; FRANKENBUŠOVÁ; BORN 1928; DEPORTED 1942; TO THERESIENSTADT; MURDERED 17.9.1942; IN MAJDANEK	Senožaty 82; 49°34′09″N 15°11′58″E	Věra Frankenbušová, also Frankenbuschová, was born on 1 January 1928. Her parents were Rudolf Frankenbuš and Františka née Herrmann. She had an older brother, Zdeněk. Her father ran a general store in Senožaty. On 13 June 1942, she and her family were deported from Kolín to Theresienstadt concentration camp by transport AAd (his number on the transport was 638). When the train arrived at the station of Bohušovice, she and her family were immediately taken to a waiting train and transported towards east with transport AAi (his number on this transport was 970). This train was later known as the Lost Train of Kolín as we still don't know where it was headed to. But it has been proven the none of the 1,000 Jews on this train did survive the Shoah. Her father was brought to Majdanek concentration camp, had to do forced labour and died there on 17 September 1942. The inscription on the Stolperstein indicates, that also Věra Frankenbušová was murdered that same day. This appears to be unsecured due to the sources. Věra Frankenbusch did not survive the Shoah, neither her mother or her brother.

== Třebíč ==
Stone	Inscription	Location	Life and death
	HERE LIVED; ARNOŠT BENEŠ; BORN 1900; DEPORTED 1943; TO AUSCHWITZ; MURDERED 1943	ul. Leopolda Pokorného 15/10; 49°13′00″N 15°52′35″E	Arnošt Beneš was born on 11 October 1911 as the third of four children of a family of glaziers. He attended the school in Třebíč, then graduated as a merchant. He worked in a seed business in the Karlově náměstí č. 25. After successfully concluding his exams, he conducted the business alone. In 1932 he was married to Ingeborg née Schimkovou, who came from Brno. In October 1933 the first daughter of the couple, Susanna, was born, four years later the second daughter, Hana. Arnošt Beneš became acquainted with the painter and photographer Ludvik Bahner (1891-1971) and began to photograph himself. In 1932/1933 as well as in 1934/1935 he participated in exhibitions of the club of amateurs, which took place in the Academy of Trebič. Beneš received the first prize. In 1935 he participated in a jubilee exhibition of the city, which showed the Jewish quarter of Třebíč from 1335 to 1935. His paintings were also exhibited in exhibitions in Jihlava and Brno. He also liked to draw, made puppet theater and toys for his daughters, and built furniture decorated with marquetry. He was a collector of small art objects and figures and had a small collection of paintings. In 1940 all the valuables were taken away from the National Socialists, including his collections and even his camera. His Chinese porcelain was smashed by the Nazis. From now on, working in the business was no longer possible. In May 1942 the Jews were rounded up in the Jewish quarter and deported to Theresienstadt and Auschwitz. Arnošt had to carry out forced labor on the construction of a railway bridge in Sázava, but on 16 November 1942 he was also deported with transport Cb from Tábor to Theresienstadt. His number on the transport was 1. On 10 January 1943, he was transferred to Auschwitz concentration camp with the transport Cq. His number on the transport was 696. Of 1998 people who were in this prison transport, only one person survived. Arnošt Beneš was murdered in Auschwitz on 5 March 1943. Only thirty-five of the Trebič Jews have survived the Holocaust.. Susanna Urbanová, the oldest daughter of Arnošt Beneš, was one of the survivors. She lives in Trebič.
	HERE LIVED; WALTER FÜRNBERG; BORN 1898; DEPORTED 1943; TO AUSCHWITZ; MURDERED 1943	Havlíčkovo nábřeží 1; 49°13′00″N 15°52′35″E	Walter Fürnberg was born on 25 November 1898. He was married to Anna. In 1942, his house was taken away by the Nazis in there course of ″Aryanization″. In May 1942, the Jews of Trebič were rounded up in the Jewish quarter and deported to Theresienstadt and Auschwitz. Walter Fürnberg was deported to Auschwitz concentration camp, where he was murdered on 5 March 1943. Only thirty-five of the Trebič Jews have survived the Holocaust.
	HERE LIVED; ANNA INGBEROVÁ; NÉE TAUSSIGOVÁ; BORN 1922; DEPORTED 1943; TO THERESIENSTADT; MURDERED 1943; IN AUSCHWITZ	Karlovo nám. 16; 49°12′59″N 15°52′52″E	Anna Ingberová née Taussigová was born on 11 January 1922 in Trebič. She came from a merchant family, her parents had a shop in the city. Anna was married to the last Rabbi of Trebič, Rabbi Moses Ingber. She married at the age of 17, shortly before the outbreak of the war. Rabbi Ingber had come from Ruthenia in 1935 to take over the Trebič rabbinate. In May 1942, the Jews were rounded up in the Jewish quarter and deported to Theresienstadt and Auschwitz. Rabbi Ingber was also deported, he did not survive the Shoah. His wife, Anna, was deported from Prague to Theresienstadt concentration camp on 6 March 1943 with transport Cv. Her transport number was 983. From there she was transferred to Auschwitz concentration camp on 6 September 1943. Her transport number was 2512. On this day, 5,007 Jews were deported from Theresienstadt to Auschwitz, both transports arrived there on 8 March 1943. Of these 5,007 people not even forty have survived. Anna Ingerbová was murdered in Auschwitz.

== Žirovnice ==
Stone	Inscription	Location	Life and death
	HERE LIVED; EDUARD PFEFFER; BORN 1875; DEPORTED 1942; TO THERESIENSTADT; 1943 TO AUSCHWITZ; MURDERED	Podhadrí 267; 49°15′09″N 15°11′10″E	Eduard Pfeffer was born on 4 September 1875. He was married to Marie Pfefferová. Their last residence before deportation was in Borovice. On 16 November 1942 he and his wife were deported by transport Cb from Tábor to Theresienstadt concentration camp. His transport number was 138 of 619. On 6 September 1943 the couple were deported by transport Dm to Auschwitz. His transport number was 3360 of 2451 in the second train. Eduard Pfeffer and his wife were murdered in the course of the Shoah.
	HERE LIVED; MARIE PFEFFEROFÁ; NÉE LUSTIGOVÁ; BORN 1884; DEPORTED 1942; TO THERESIENSTADT; 1943 TO AUSCHWITZ; MURDERED	Podhadrí 267; 49°15′09″N 15°11′10″E	Marie Pfefferová née Lustigová was born on 4 January 1884. She was married to Eduard Pfeffer. Their last residence before deportation was in Borovice. On 16 November 1942 she and her husband were deported by transport Cb from Tábor to Theresienstadt concentration camp. Her transport number was 139 of 619. On 6 September 1943 the couple were deported by transport Dm to Auschwitz. Her transport number was 3361 of 2451 in the second train. Marie Pfefferová and her husband were murdered in the course of the Shoah.

== Dates of collocations ==
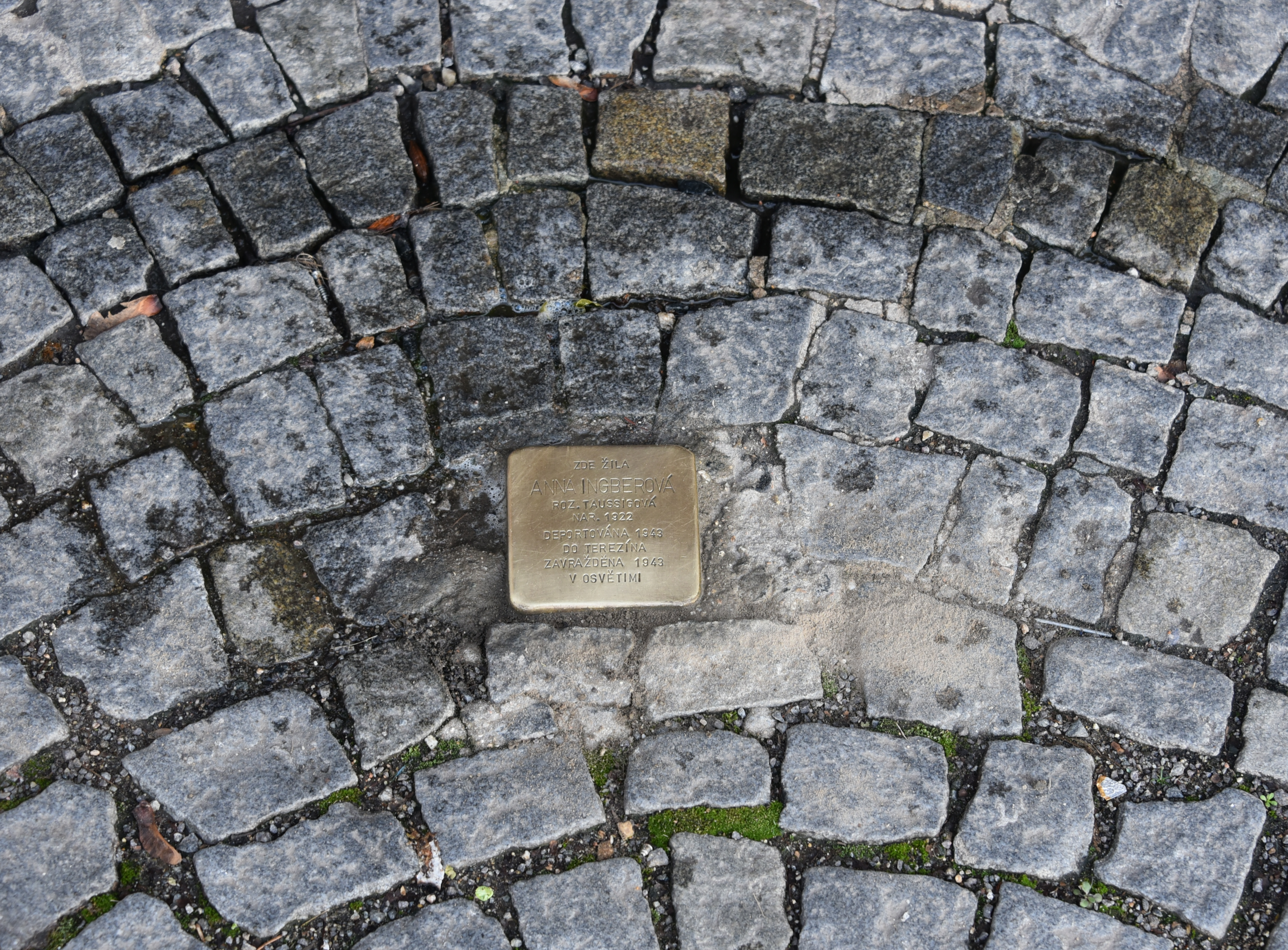
Stolperstein for Anna Ingberová in Třebíč, 2015

The Stolpersteine in the Kraj Vysočina were collocated by the artist himself on the following dates:

- 18 July 2013: Třebíč
- 14 September 2014: Pacov
- 15 September 2014: Havlíčkův Brod
- 3 August 2015: Senožaty
- 3 August 2016: Chotěboř
- 4 August 2016: Žirovnice
- 14 August 2018: Jihlava

The collocations in Chotěboř were initiated by Markéta Kadlecová.

The Czech Stolperstein project was initiated in 2008 by the Česká unie židovské mládeže (Czech Union of Jewish Youth) and was realized with the patronage of the Mayor of Prague.

== See also ==
- List of cities by country that have stolpersteine
- Stolpersteine in the Czech Republic
