= Karl Josef Müller =

German painter

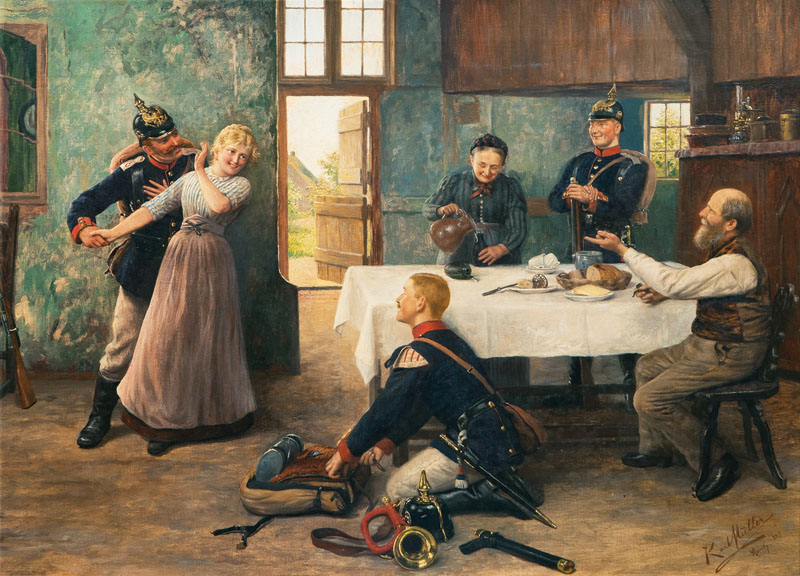
The Happy Farewell

Karl Josef Müller (1865 – 1942) was a German genre painter and lithographer; of Jewish ancestry.

== Biography ==
He was born on 19 January 1865 in the Free and Hanseatic City of Hamburg to Abraham Müller, a cigar manufacturer, and his wife, Henriette née Burchard. After attending the Israelitische Freischule, he served a three-year apprenticeship with a lithographer. From 1886 to 1888, he was enrolled at the Kunstgewerbeschule Dresden (Arts and Crafts School), where he studied with the history painter and art restorer, Ermenegildo Antonio Donadini. He completed his studies at the Prussian Academy of Arts.

Back in Hamburg, he was a one-year volunteer with an infantry regiment; making drawings for use by his unit. This inspired him to continue creating works on military subjects for many years. The Kunstverein in Hamburg (Artists' Association) acquired several such works for raffles and lotteries.

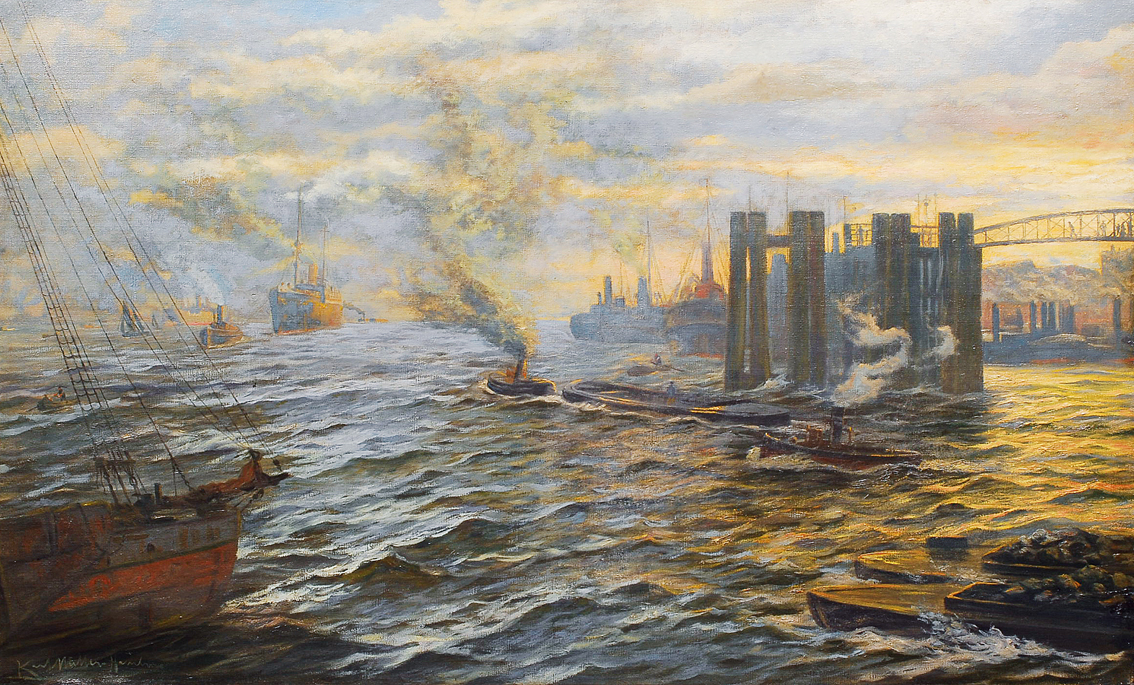
Hamburg harbor

In 1903, at the age of thirty-eight, he married Louise Rebecca Franziska Hauer, the daughter of Martin Hauer, a soap and perfume manufacturer. They had two daughters: Karla (1904), who became a singer, and Lotte (1911), who became an actress.

He was a member of the Allgemeine Deutsche Kunstgenossenschaft (Art Cooperative), the Hamburger Künstlerverein von 1832. Jüdischer Kulturbund. He was too old to participate in World War I, and ceased painting military subjects when it was over. During the period of hyperinflation, he lost all of his money, and his family was forced to move frequently. Despite this, they were able to spend some time in Denmark and Sweden.

After the National Socialist party came to power, they established the Reich Chamber of Culture (1933), which all artists were required to join. Artists of Jewish descent were, of course, excluded. Some of his works continued to appear, in publications such as the Hamburger Fremdenblatt, until 1934. He was not formally excluded from the Chamber until 1938. During those years, he participated in the activities of the Jüdischer Kulturbund, which had also been established in 1933. He was totally dependent on welfare by 1941. As the situation worsened, he made an apparently futile effort to save his remaining paintings by sending them abroad.

In July 1942, he and Louise were moved to a collection point for "deportation". From there, they were taken by train to Bauschowitz, then had to walk three kilometers to Theresienstadt. They were part of the first group to arrive. He died there in October; allegedly from heart failure. The art historian, Maike Bruhns, has concluded that he actually died of starvation. In May 1944, Louise was moved to the Auschwitz concentration camp. The exact date of her death is unknown.

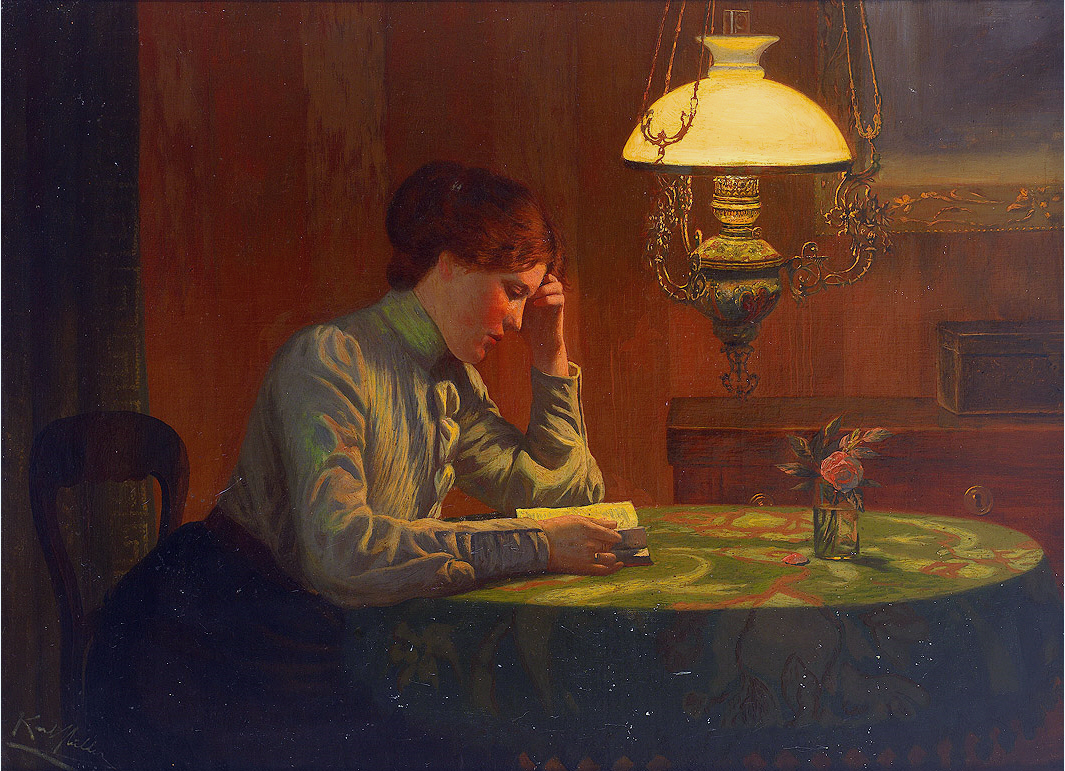
Young Woman Reading by the Light of an Oil Lamp

Most of his works have been preserved in private collections. Some are in the Museum for Hamburg History. His paintings and drawings were reproduced in several publications, including Die Gartenlaube, as well as the above-mentioned Hamburger Fremdenblatt.

== Sources ==
- "Müller, Karl", In: Friedrich von Boetticher: Malerwerke des 19. Jahrhunderts, Beitrag zur Kunstgeschichte, Vol.2, 1898, pg.100 (Online)
- "Müller, Karl", In: Dresslers Kunsthandbuch 1907, pg.140 (Online)
- "Müller, Karl", In: Ernst Rump: Lexikon der bildenden Künstler Hamburgs, Altonas und der näheren Umgebung, Otto Bröcker & Co., Hamburg 1912, pg.92 (Online)
- "Müller, Karl", In: Allgemeines Lexikon der Bildenden Künstler von der Antike bis zur Gegenwart, Vol. 25: Moehring–Olivié, E. A. Seemann, Leipzig 1931
- Maike Bruhns: Kunst in der Krise, Vol.2: "Künstlerlexikon Hamburg 1933–1945", Dölling und Galitz, 2001, pp. 294–295 ISBN 3-933374-95-2
