= Senožaty =

- Municipality
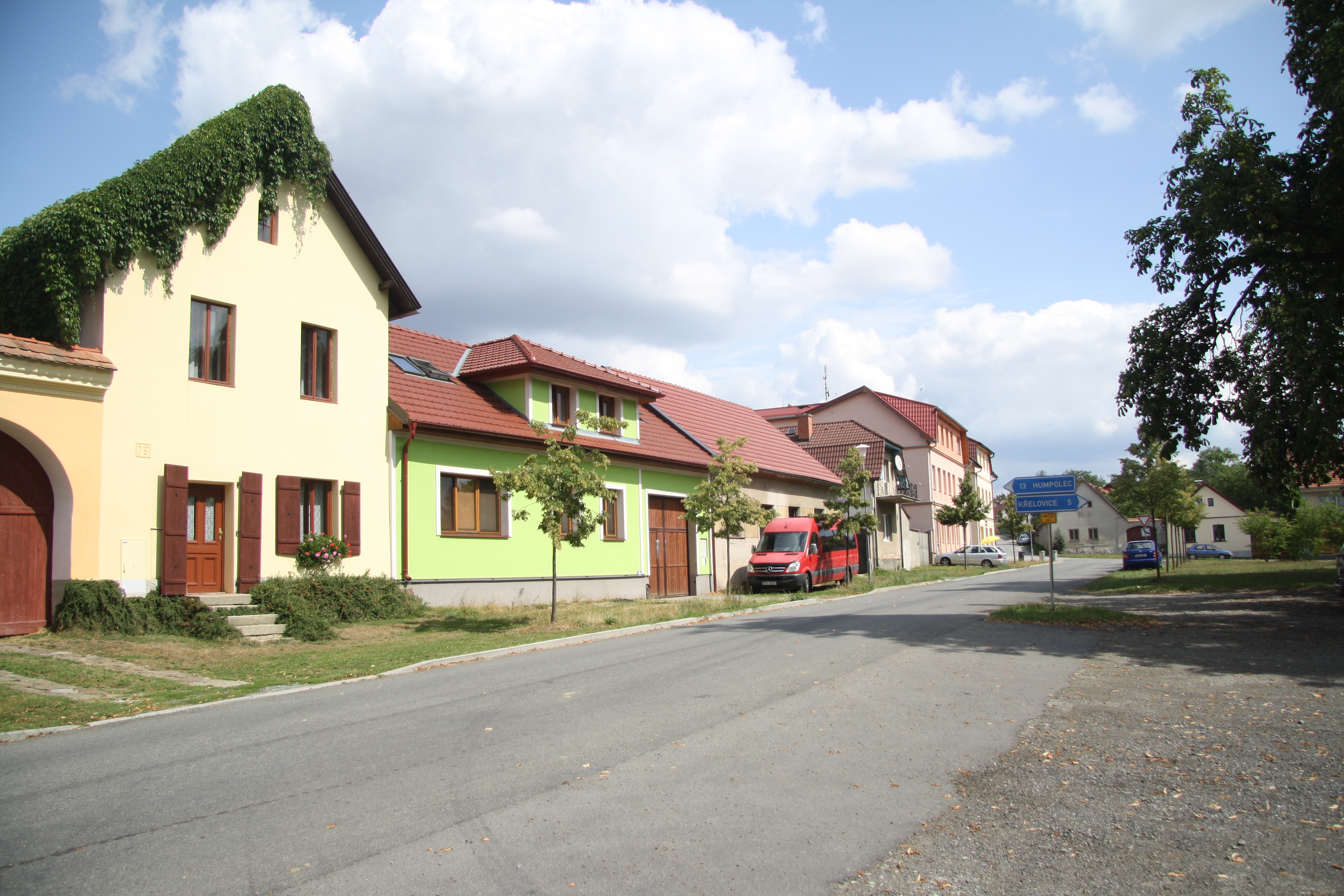
- Centre of Senožaty

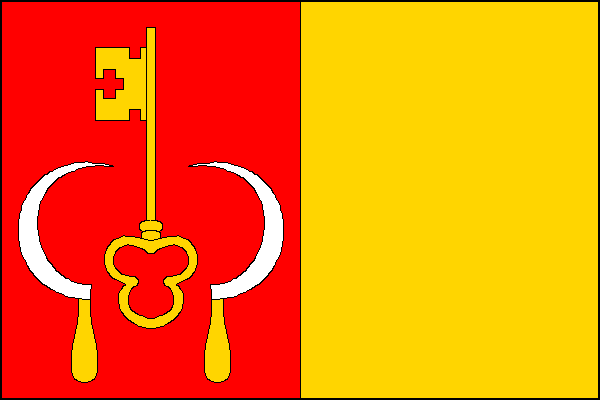
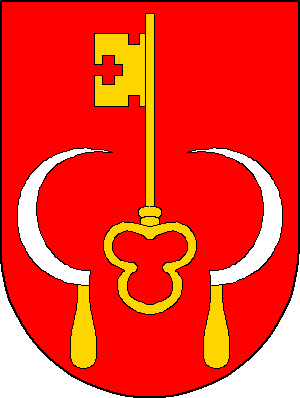
- Flag Coat of arms

- Location in the Czech Republic
- Coordinates: 49°34′9″N 15°11′53″E
- Country: Czech Republic
- Region: Vysočina
- District: Pelhřimov
- First mentioned: 1352

Area
  - Total: 18.21 km^{2} (7.03 sq mi)
- Elevation: 463 m (1,519 ft)

Population (2026-01-01)
  - Total: 882
  - Density: 48.4/km^{2} (125/sq mi)
- Time zone: UTC+1 (CET)
  - Summer (DST): UTC+2 (CEST)
- Postal codes: 394 56, 396 01
- Website: www.senozaty.cz

Senožaty is a municipality and village in Pelhřimov District in the Vysočina Region of the Czech Republic. It has about 900 inhabitants.

Senožaty lies approximately 16 kilometres (10 mi) north of Pelhřimov, 34 km (21 mi) north-west of Jihlava, and 81 km (50 mi) south-east of Prague.

== Administrative division ==
Senožaty consists of four municipal parts (in brackets population according to the 2021 census):

- Senožaty (732)
- Nečice (20)
- Otavožaty (27)
- Tukleky (38)

== Demographics ==
Historical population
Year	Pop.	±%
1869	1,419	—
1880	1,428	+0.6%
1890	1,380	−3.4%
1900	1,449	+5.0%
1910	1,376	−5.0%
1921	1,328	−3.5%
1930	1,142	−14.0%
1950	889	−22.2%
1961	1,041	+17.1%
1970	924	−11.2%
1980	808	−12.6%
1991	734	−9.2%
2001	717	−2.3%
2011	768	+7.1%
2021	817	+6.4%
Source: Censuses
