= Bohušovice nad Ohří =

- Town
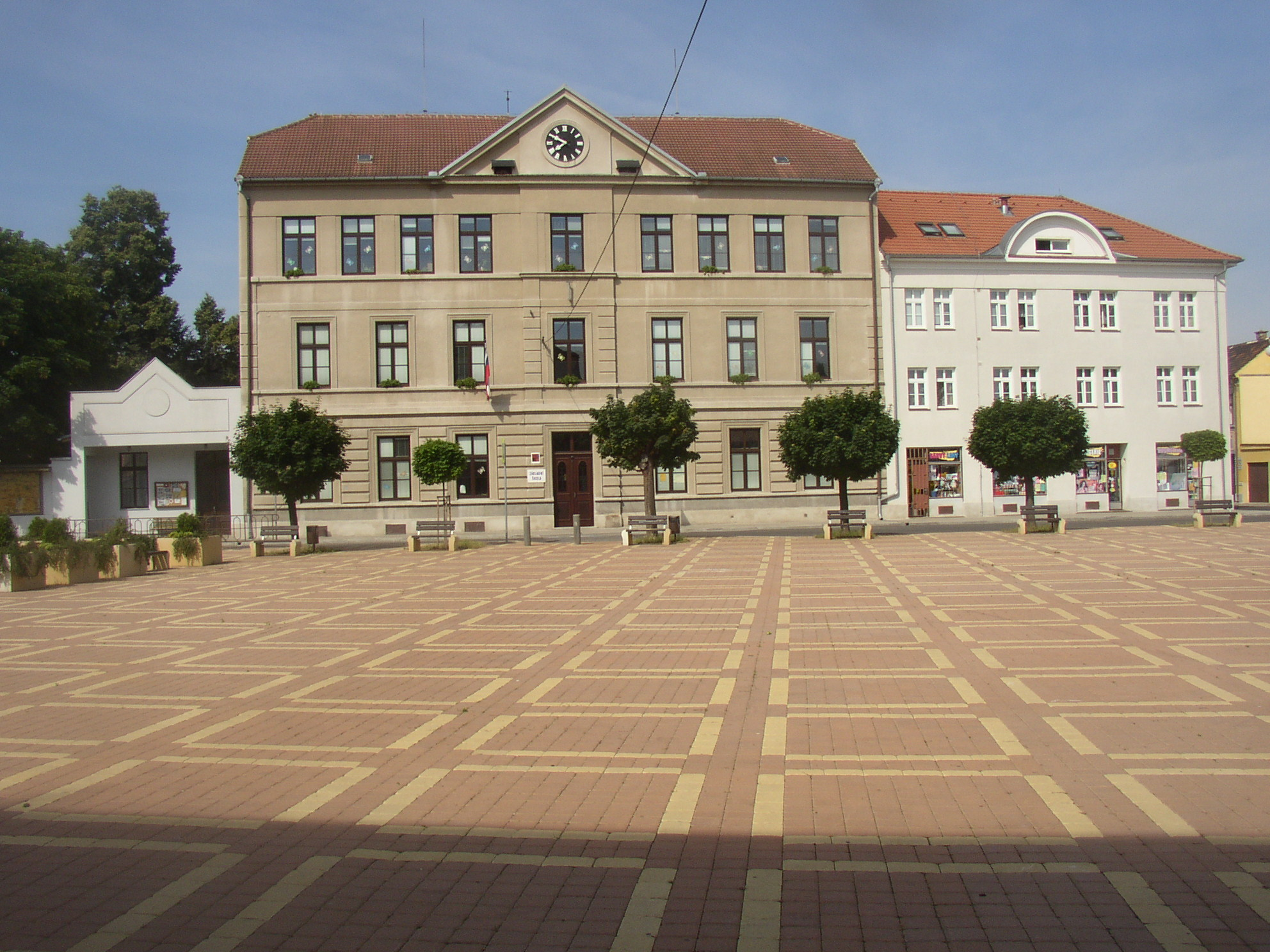
- Primary school on the square Husovo náměstí

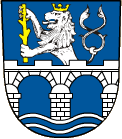
- Flag Coat of arms

- Location in the Czech Republic
- Coordinates: 50°29′37″N 14°09′02″E
- Country: Czech Republic
- Region: Ústí nad Labem
- District: Litoměřice
- First mentioned: 993

Government
  - Mayor: Kamila Čvančarová

Area
  - Total: 8.62 km^{2} (3.33 sq mi)
- Elevation: 150 m (490 ft)

Population (2026-01-01)
  - Total: 2,393
  - Density: 278/km^{2} (719/sq mi)
- Time zone: UTC+1 (CET)
  - Summer (DST): UTC+2 (CEST)
- Postal code: 411 56
- Website: www.bohusovice.cz

Bohušovice nad Ohří (Czech pronunciation: [ˈboɦuʃovɪtsɛ ˈnat oɦr̝iː]; German: Bauschowitz an der Eger) is a town in Litoměřice District in the Ústí nad Labem Region of the Czech Republic. It has about 2,400 inhabitants. The town is located on the left bank of the Ohře River in the Lower Ohře Table.

Bohušovice nad Ohří existed already in the 10th century, but it became a town only in 1920. The main landmark of the town is the Church of Saints Procopius and Nicholas.

== Administrative division ==
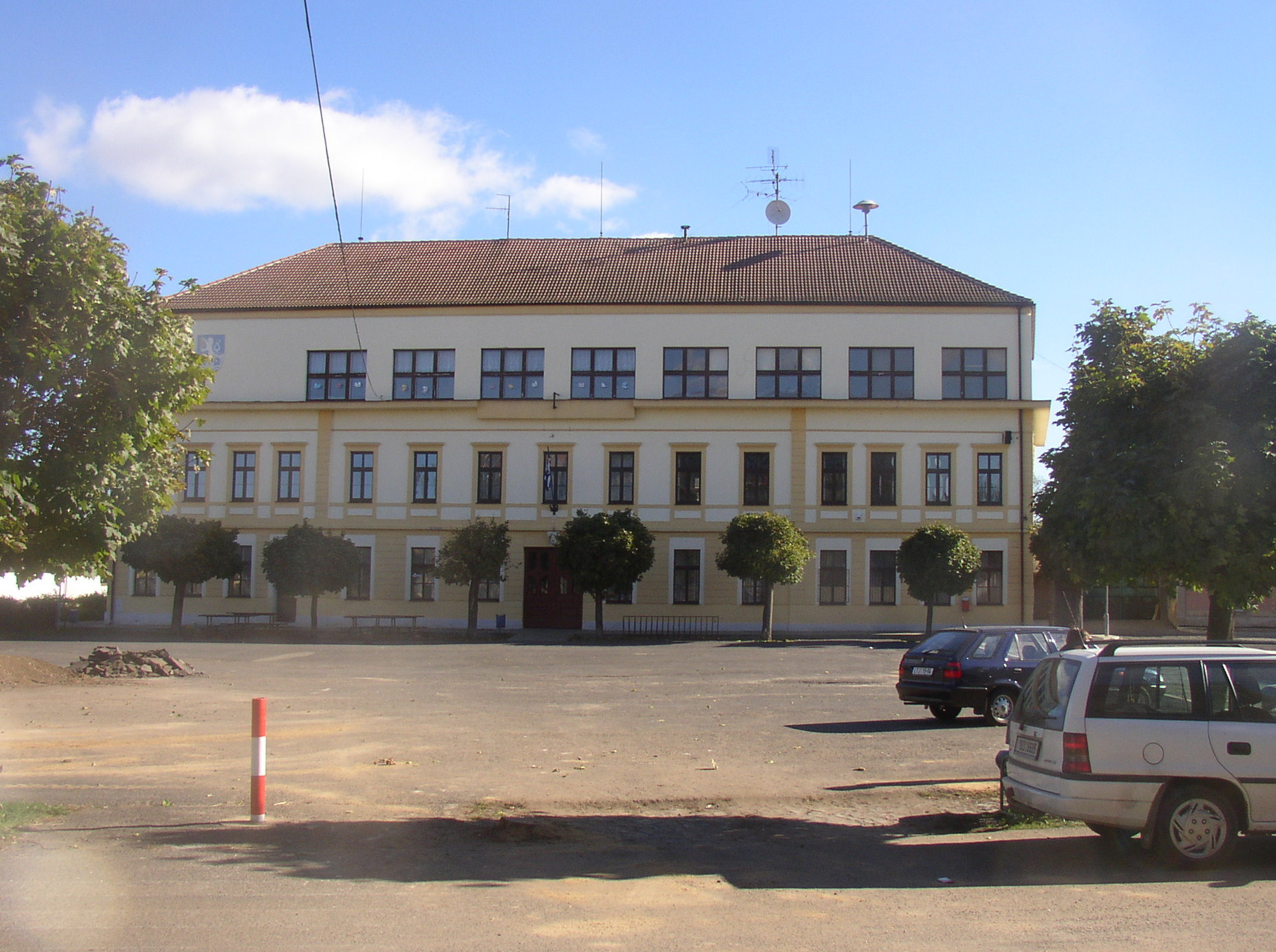
Town hall

Bohušovice nad Ohří consists of two municipal parts (in brackets population according to the 2021 census):

- Bohušovice nad Ohří (2,078)
- Hrdly (337)

== Etymology ==
The initial name of the settlement was Búšovice. The name was derived from the personal name Búš, meaning "the village of Búš's people". Because Búš was a shortened form of the name Bohuš, the name of the settlement was distorted to its present form in the 14th century.

== Geography ==
Bohušovice nad Ohří is located about 5 kilometres (3 mi) south of Litoměřice and 20 km (12 mi) southeast of Ústí nad Labem. It lies in a flat agricultural landscape in the Lower Ohře Table. The town proper lies on the left bank of the Ohře River.

== History ==
The first written mention of Bohušovice nad Ohří is from 993, when Duke Boleslaus II donated the village to the Břevnov Monastery. The village often changed hands. In 1384, the monastery in Doksany had built the Church of Saint Procopius. From 1436 to 1460, Bohušovice was owned by the town of Litoměřice, and then it was acquired by Vilém of Kounice, who sold it to the Kaplíř of Sulejovice family. However, after a court trial, the village returned to the ownership of the Doksany Monastery.

During the Thirty Years' War, Bohušovice was repeatedly looted and damaged by Saxons and Swedes. After the partial restoration of the village, it was once again plundered, this time by the Prussians in the Seven Years' War.

The economic development of the village started with the construction of the railway from Prague to Dresden, which was put into operation in 1850. In 1920, Bohušovice was promoted to a town. After it ceased to be a town during World War II, the status of the town was restored in 1998.

== Demographics ==
Historical population

Year	Pop.	±%
1869	966	—
1880	1,520	+57.3%
1890	1,799	+18.4%
1900	1,908	+6.1%
1910	2,173	+13.9%

Year	Pop.	±%
1921	2,143	−1.4%
1930	2,083	−2.8%
1950	1,619	−22.3%
1961	1,739	+7.4%
1970	1,651	−5.1%

Year	Pop.	±%
1980	2,149	+30.2%
1991	2,468	+14.8%
2001	2,535	+2.7%
2011	2,481	−2.1%
2021	2,415	−2.7%

Source: Censuses

== Transport ==
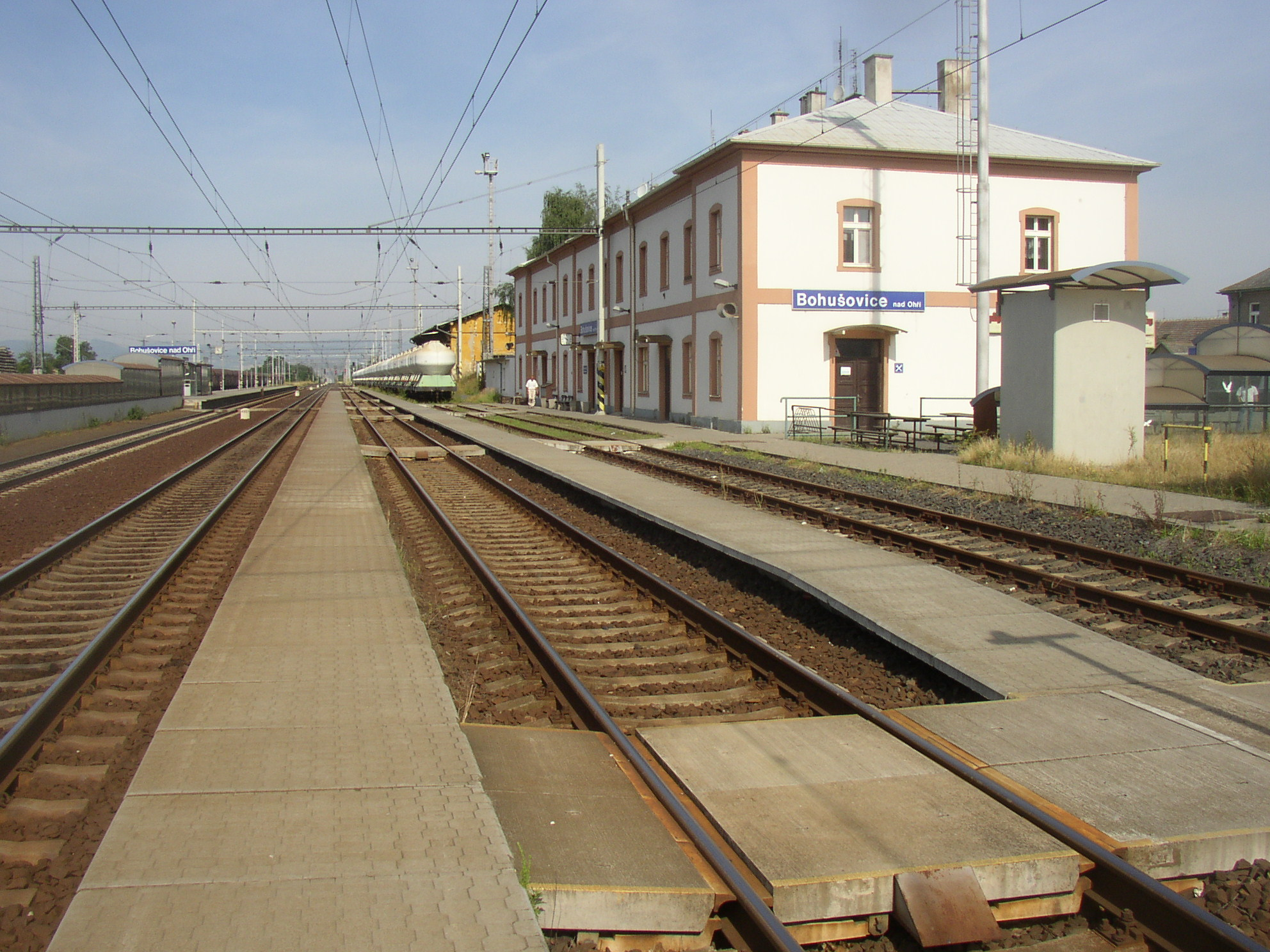
Train station

Bohušovice nad Ohří is located on the railway line Prague–Děčín.

== Sights ==
The main landmark of Bohušovice nad Ohří is the Church of Saints Procopius and Nicholas. It is a Baroque church of high artistic level from 1716. It has an originally Gothic tower.

Other sights are the Chapel of Saint Anne, built in the Empire style in the first half of the 19th century, and a stone Empire bridge over the Ohře from 1848.

== Gallery ==
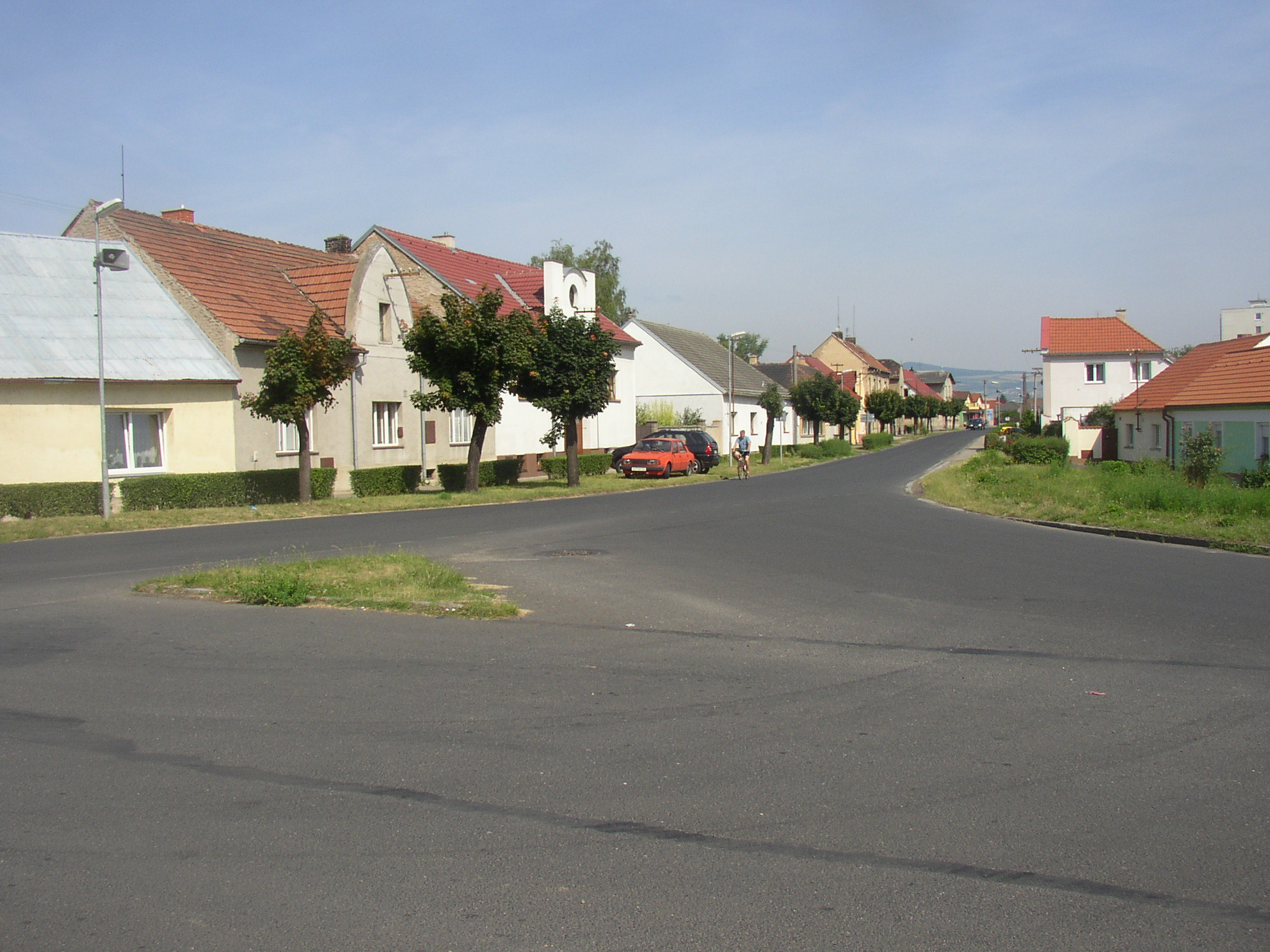
Masarykova Street

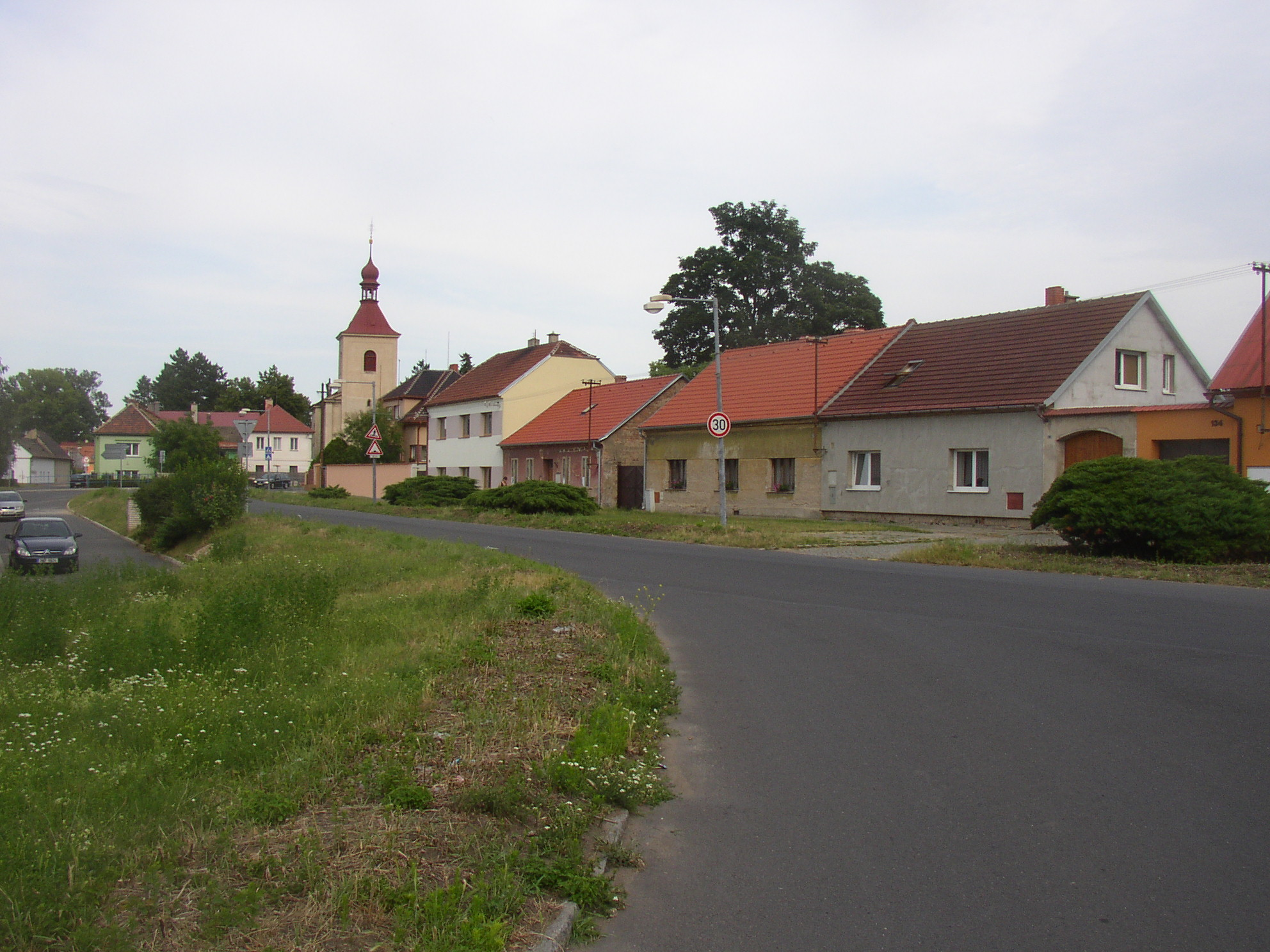
Tylova Street

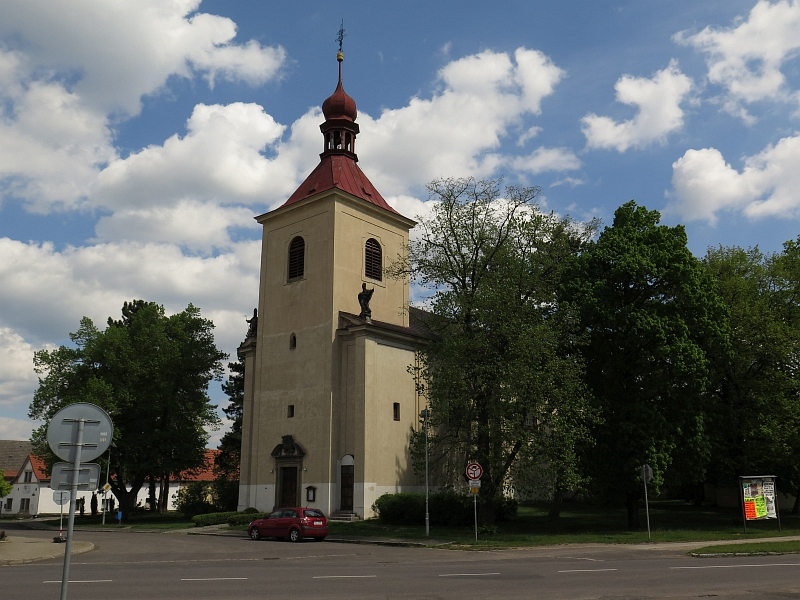
Church of Saints Procopius and Nicholas

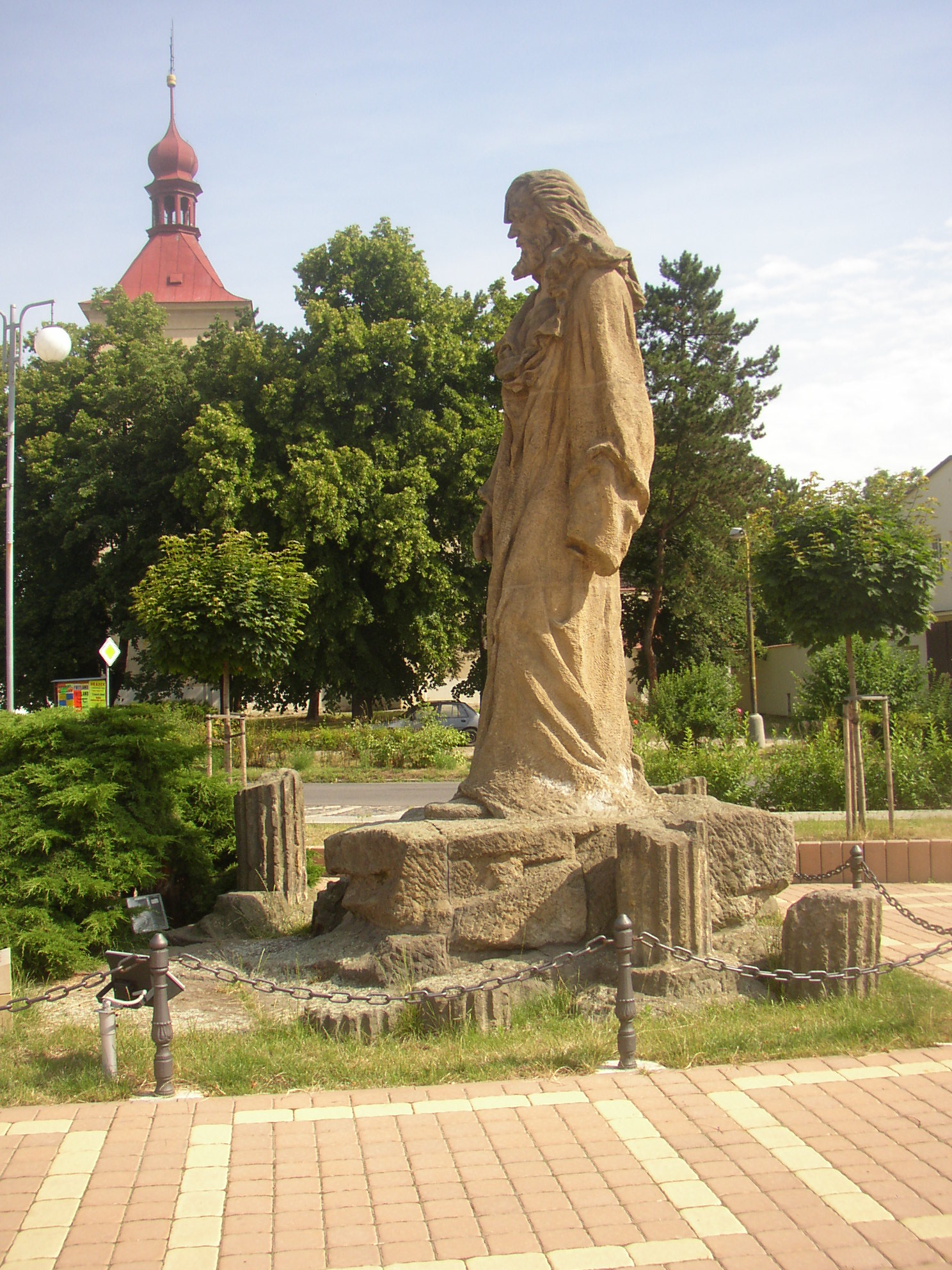
Monument to Jan Hus
