= Runge (surname) =

Runge is a surname. Notable people with the surname include:

- Aino Runge (1926–2014), Estonian financial economist, consumer defender and politician
- August H. Runge (1852–1921), American Fire Marshal
- Boris Runge (1925–1990), Russian actor and TV anchor
- Brian Runge (born 1970), American baseball umpire
- Carl Runge (1856–1927), German physicist and mathematician
- Carlisle Runge (1920–1983), American lawyer and diplomat
- Cierra Runge (born 1996), American swimmer
- Dan Runge (born 1961), Canadian football player
- Friedlieb Ferdinand Runge (1795–1867), German chemist
- Iris Runge (1888-1966), German applied mathematician and physicist
- Kurt Runge (1887–1959), German rower
- Mary Munson Runge (1928–2014), American pharmacist
- Morgan Runge (born 1997), Canadian football player
- Norah Cecil Runge (1884–1978), British politician
- Philipp Otto Runge (1777–1810), German painter
- Wilhelm Runge (1895-1987), German electrical engineer and physicist

== Fictional characters ==
- Inspector Heinrich Runge (although it is more often spelled "Lunge"), a character in the Monster series
