= 1910 United States census =

13th US national census

Thirteenth census of the United States
- April 15, 1910
- U.S. Census Bureau seal

General information
- Country: United States

Results
- Total population: 92,228,496 (▲21%)
- Most populous state: New York; 9,113,614
- Least populous state: Nevada; 81,875

The 1910 United States census, conducted by the Census Bureau on April 15, 1910, determined the resident population of the United States to be 92,228,496, an increase of 21 percent over the 76,212,168 persons enumerated during the 1900 census. The 1910 census switched from a portrait page orientation to a landscape orientation.

This was the last census in which Texas did not record any top 50 largest cities by population, despite being the 5th most populous state at the time. It was also the first census in which all the top 50 largest cities had population over 100,000.

The 1910 census was the first to use metropolitan districts, the predecessor to modern metropolitan statistical areas, which were defined for all cities with at least 200,000 people.

== Organization ==
Dr. Edward Dana Durand, then-head of the Bureau of Corporations, was appointed in 1909 to oversee the census. $14 million were allocated to conduct the census.

== Census questions ==
The 1910 census collected the following information:

- address
- name
- relationship to head of family
- sex
- race
- age
- marital status and, if married, number of years of present marriage
- for women, number of children born and number now living
- place of birth and mother tongue of person, and their parents
- if foreign born, year of immigration; whether naturalized; whether able to speak English and, if unable, language spoken
- occupation, industry and class of worker
- if an employee, whether out of work during year
- literacy
- school attendance
- whether home owned or rented, and, if owned, whether mortgaged
- whether farm or house
- whether a survivor of Union or Confederate Army or Navy
- whether blind, deaf, or dumb

Full documentation for the 1910 census, including census forms and enumerator instructions, is available from the Integrated Public Use Microdata Series.

== Column titles ==
The column titles in the census form are as follows:

LOCATION. Street, avenue, road, etc.
House number (in cities or towns).
1. Number of dwelling house in order of visitation.
2. Number of family in order of visitation.

3. NAME of each person whose place of abode on April 15, 1910, was in this family.

Enter surname first, then the given name and middle initial, if any.

Include every person living on April 15, 1910. Omit children born since April 15, 1910.

RELATION.

4. Relationship of this person to the head of the family.

PERSONAL DESCRIPTION.

5. Sex.

6. Color or race.

7. Age at last birthday.

8. Whether single, married, widowed, or divorced.

9. Number of years of present marriage.

10. Mother of how many children: Number born.

11. Mother of how many children: Number now living.

NATIVITY.

Place of birth of each person and parents of each person enumerated. If born in the United States, give the state or territory. If of foreign birth, give the country.

12. Place of birth of this Person.

13. Place of birth of Father of this person.

14. Place of birth of Mother of this person.

CITIZENSHIP.

15. Year of immigration to the United States.

16. Whether naturalized or alien.

17. Whether able to speak English; or, if not, give language spoken.

OCCUPATION.

18. Trade or profession of, or particular kind of work done by this person, as spinner, salesman, laborer, etc.,

19. General nature of industry, business, or establishment in which this person works, as cotton mill, dry goods store, farm, etc.

20. Whether as employer, employee, or work on own account.

If an employee – 21. Whether out of work on April 15, 1910.

22. Number of weeks out of work during year 1909.

EDUCATION.

23. Whether able to read.

24. Whether able to write.

25. Attended school any time since September 1, 1909.

OWNERSHIP OF HOME.

26. Owned or rented.

27. Owned free or mortgaged.

28. Farm or house.

29. Number of farm schedule.

30. Whether a survivor of the Union or Confederate Army or Navy.

31. Whether blind (both eyes).

32. Whether deaf and dumb.

== State rankings ==
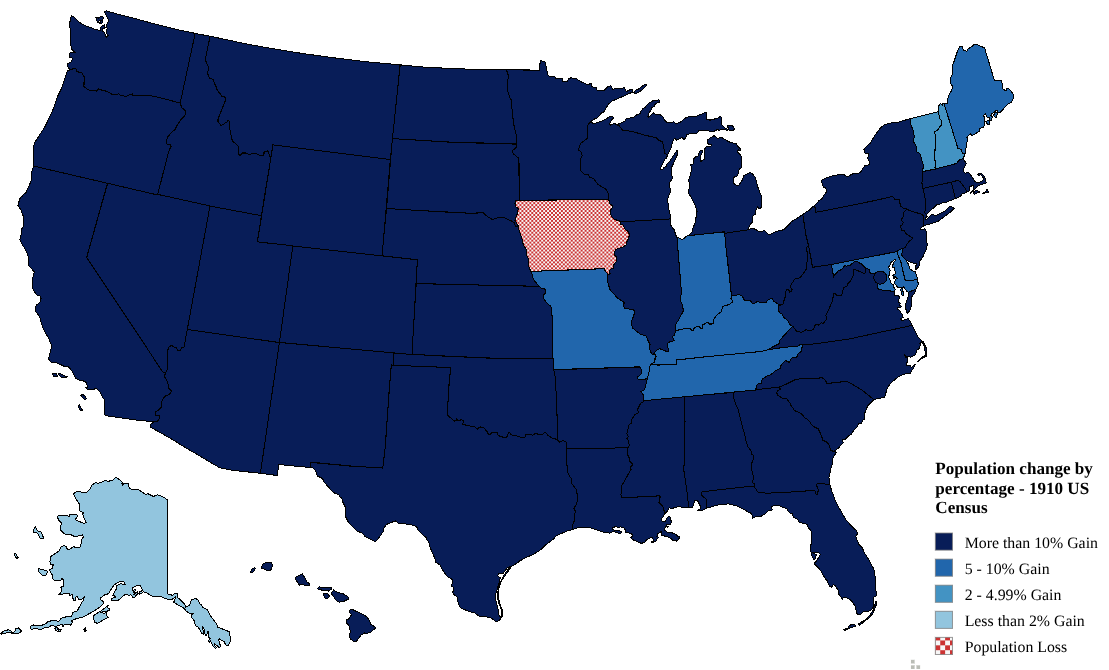
A map showing the population change of each US State by percentage.

Rank	State	Population as of 1910 census	Population as of 1900 census	Change	Percent change
1	New York	9,113,614	7,268,894	1,844,720 ▲	25.4% ▲
2	Pennsylvania	7,665,111	6,302,115	1,362,996 ▲	21.6% ▲
3	Illinois	5,638,591	4,821,550	817,041 ▲	16.9% ▲
4	Ohio	4,767,121	4,157,545	609,576 ▲	14.7% ▲
5	Texas	3,896,542	3,048,710	847,832 ▲	27.8% ▲
6	Massachusetts	3,366,416	2,805,346	561,070 ▲	20.0% ▲
7	Missouri	3,293,335	3,106,665	186,670 ▲	6.0% ▲
8	Michigan	2,810,173	2,420,982	389,191 ▲	16.1% ▲
9	Indiana	2,700,876	2,516,462	184,414 ▲	7.3% ▲
10	Georgia	2,609,121	2,216,331	392,790 ▲	17.7% ▲
11	New Jersey	2,537,167	1,883,669	653,498 ▲	34.7% ▲
12	California	2,377,549	1,485,053	892,496 ▲	60.1% ▲
13	Wisconsin	2,333,860	2,069,042	264,818 ▲	12.8% ▲
14	Kentucky	2,289,905	2,147,174	142,731 ▲	6.6% ▲
15	Iowa	2,224,771	2,231,853	−7,082 ▼	−0.3% ▼
16	North Carolina	2,206,287	1,893,810	312,477 ▲	16.5% ▲
17	Tennessee	2,184,789	2,020,616	164,173 ▲	8.1% ▲
18	Alabama	2,138,093	1,828,697	309,396 ▲	16.9% ▲
19	Minnesota	2,075,708	1,751,394	324,314 ▲	18.5% ▲
20	Virginia	2,061,612	1,854,184	207,428 ▲	11.2% ▲
21	Mississippi	1,797,114	1,551,270	245,844 ▲	15.8% ▲
22	Kansas	1,690,949	1,470,495	220,454 ▲	15.0% ▲
23	Oklahoma	1,657,155	790,391	866,764 ▲	109.7% ▲
24	Louisiana	1,656,388	1,381,625	274,763 ▲	19.9% ▲
25	Arkansas	1,574,449	1,311,564	262,885 ▲	20.0% ▲
26	South Carolina	1,515,400	1,340,316	175,084 ▲	13.1% ▲
27	Maryland	1,295,346	1,188,044	107,302 ▲	9.0% ▲
28	West Virginia	1,221,119	958,800	262,319 ▲	27.4% ▲
29	Nebraska	1,192,214	1,066,300	125,914 ▲	11.8% ▲
30	Washington	1,141,990	518,103	623,887 ▲	120.4% ▲
31	Connecticut	1,114,756	908,420	206,336 ▲	22.7% ▲
32	Colorado	799,024	539,700	259,324 ▲	48.0% ▲
33	Florida	752,619	528,542	224,077 ▲	42.4% ▲
34	Maine	742,371	694,466	47,905 ▲	6.9% ▲
35	Oregon	672,765	413,536	259,229 ▲	62.7% ▲
36	South Dakota	583,888	401,570	182,318 ▲	45.4% ▲
37	North Dakota	577,056	319,146	257,910 ▲	80.8% ▲
38	Rhode Island	542,610	428,556	114,054 ▲	26.6% ▲
39	New Hampshire	430,572	411,588	18,984 ▲	4.6% ▲
40	Montana	376,053	243,329	132,724 ▲	54.5% ▲
41	Utah	373,351	276,749	96,602 ▲	34.9% ▲
42	Vermont	355,956	343,641	12,315 ▲	3.6% ▲
–	District of Columbia	331,069	278,718	52,351 ▲	18.8% ▲
–	New Mexico	327,301	195,310	131,991 ▲	67.6% ▲
43	Idaho	325,594	161,772	163,822 ▲	101.3% ▲
–	Arizona	204,354	122,931	81,423 ▲	66.2% ▲
44	Delaware	202,322	184,735	17,587 ▲	9.5% ▲
–	Hawaii	191,874	154,001	37,873 ▲	24.6% ▲
45	Wyoming	145,965	92,531	53,434 ▲	57.7% ▲
46	Nevada	81,875	42,335	39,540 ▲	93.4% ▲
–	Alaska	64,356	63,592	764 ▲	1.2% ▲

== City rankings ==
Rank	City	State	Population	Region (2016)
01	New York	New York	4,766,883	Northeast
02	Chicago	Illinois	2,185,283	Midwest
03	Philadelphia	Pennsylvania	1,549,008	Northeast
04	St. Louis	Missouri	687,029	Midwest
05	Boston	Massachusetts	670,585	Northeast
06	Cleveland	Ohio	560,663	Midwest
07	Baltimore	Maryland	558,485	South
08	Pittsburgh	Pennsylvania	533,905	Northeast
09	Detroit	Michigan	465,766	Midwest
10	Buffalo	New York	423,715	Northeast
11	San Francisco	California	416,912	West
12	Milwaukee	Wisconsin	373,857	Midwest
13	Cincinnati	Ohio	363,591	Midwest
14	Newark	New Jersey	347,469	Northeast
15	New Orleans	Louisiana	339,075	South
16	Washington	District of Columbia	331,069	South
17	Los Angeles	California	319,198	West
18	Minneapolis	Minnesota	301,408	Midwest
19	Jersey City	New Jersey	267,779	Northeast
20	Kansas City	Missouri	248,381	Midwest
21	Seattle	Washington	237,194	West
22	Indianapolis	Indiana	233,650	Midwest
23	Providence	Rhode Island	224,326	Northeast
24	Louisville	Kentucky	223,928	South
25	Rochester	New York	218,149	Northeast
26	Saint Paul	Minnesota	214,744	Midwest
27	Denver	Colorado	213,381	West
28	Portland	Oregon	207,214	West
29	Columbus	Ohio	181,511	Midwest
30	Toledo	Ohio	168,497	Midwest
31	Atlanta	Georgia	154,839	South
32	Oakland	California	150,174	West
33	Worcester	Massachusetts	145,986	Northeast
34	Syracuse	New York	137,249	Northeast
35	New Haven	Connecticut	133,605	Northeast
36	Birmingham	Alabama	132,685	South
37	Memphis	Tennessee	131,105	South
38	Scranton	Pennsylvania	129,867	Northeast
39	Richmond	Virginia	127,628	South
40	Paterson	New Jersey	125,600	Northeast
41	Omaha	Nebraska	124,096	Midwest
42	Fall River	Massachusetts	119,295	Northeast
43	Dayton	Ohio	116,577	Midwest
44	Grand Rapids	Michigan	112,571	Midwest
45	Nashville	Tennessee	110,364	South
46	Lowell	Massachusetts	106,294	Northeast
47	Cambridge	Massachusetts	104,839	Northeast
48	Spokane	Washington	104,402	West
49	Bridgeport	Connecticut	102,054	Northeast
50	Albany	New York	100,253	Northeast
51	Hartford	Connecticut	98,915	Northeast
52	Trenton	New Jersey	96,815	Northeast
53	New Bedford	Massachusetts	96,652	Northeast
54	San Antonio	Texas	96,614	South
55	Reading	Pennsylvania	96,071	Northeast
56	Camden	New Jersey	94,538	Northeast
57	Salt Lake City	Utah	92,777	West
58	Dallas	Texas	92,104	South
59	Lynn	Massachusetts	89,336	Northeast
60	Springfield	Massachusetts	88,926	Northeast
61	Wilmington	Delaware	87,411	South
62	Des Moines	Iowa	86,368	Midwest
63	Lawrence	Massachusetts	85,892	Northeast
64	Tacoma	Washington	83,743	West
65	Kansas City	Kansas	82,331	Midwest
66	Yonkers	New York	79,803	Northeast
67	Youngstown	Ohio	79,066	Midwest
68	Houston	Texas	78,800	South
69	Duluth	Minnesota	78,466	Midwest
70	St. Joseph	Missouri	77,403	Midwest
71	Somerville	Massachusetts	77,236	Northeast
72	Troy	New York	76,813	Northeast
73	Utica	New York	74,419	Northeast
74	Elizabeth	New Jersey	73,409	Northeast
75	Fort Worth	Texas	73,312	South
76	Waterbury	Connecticut	73,141	Northeast
77	Schenectady	New York	72,826	Northeast
78	Hoboken	New Jersey	70,324	Northeast
79	Manchester	New Hampshire	70,063	Northeast
80	Evansville	Indiana	69,647	Midwest
81	Akron	Ohio	69,067	Midwest
82	Norfolk	Virginia	67,452	South
83	Wilkes-Barre	Pennsylvania	67,105	Northeast
84	Peoria	Illinois	66,950	Midwest
85	Erie	Pennsylvania	66,525	Northeast
86	Savannah	Georgia	65,064	South
87	Oklahoma City	Oklahoma	64,205	South
88	Harrisburg	Pennsylvania	64,186	Northeast
89	Fort Wayne	Indiana	63,933	Midwest
90	Charleston	South Carolina	58,833	South
91	Portland	Maine	58,571	Northeast
92	East St. Louis	Illinois	58,547	Midwest
93	Terre Haute	Indiana	58,157	Midwest
94	Holyoke	Massachusetts	57,730	Northeast
95	Jacksonville	Florida	57,699	South
96	Brockton	Massachusetts	56,878	Northeast
97	Bayonne	New Jersey	55,545	Northeast
98	Johnstown	Pennsylvania	55,482	Northeast
99	Passaic	New Jersey	54,773	Northeast
100	South Bend	Indiana	53,684	Midwest

== Locations of 50 most populous cities ==
Location of 50 largest cities by population in the United States in 1910. Not shown: Manila, Philippines.
Numbered Cities
1. Paterson, New Jersey
2. Cambridge, Massachusetts
3. Bridgeport, Connecticut

== First language of the foreign-born population ==
Rank	Language	White population
1	English and Celtic	3,363,792
2	German	2,759,032
3	Italian	1,365,110
4	Yiddish and Hebrew	1,051,767
5	Polish	943,781
6	Swedish	683,218
7	French	528,842
8	Norwegian	402,587
9	Spanish	258,131
10	Hungarian	229,094
11	Czech	228,738
12	Danish	183,844
13	Slovak	166,474
14	Dutch	151,825
15	Lithuanian and Latvian	140,963
16	Slovene	123,631
17	Finnish	119,948
18	Greek	118,379
19	Serbo-Croatian	105,669
20	Portuguese	72,649
21	Russian	57,926
22	Romanian	42,277
23	Arabic	32,868
24	Ukrainian	25,131
25	Armenian	23,938
26	Bulgarian	18,341
27	Turkish	4,709
28	Albanian	2,312

== Data availability ==
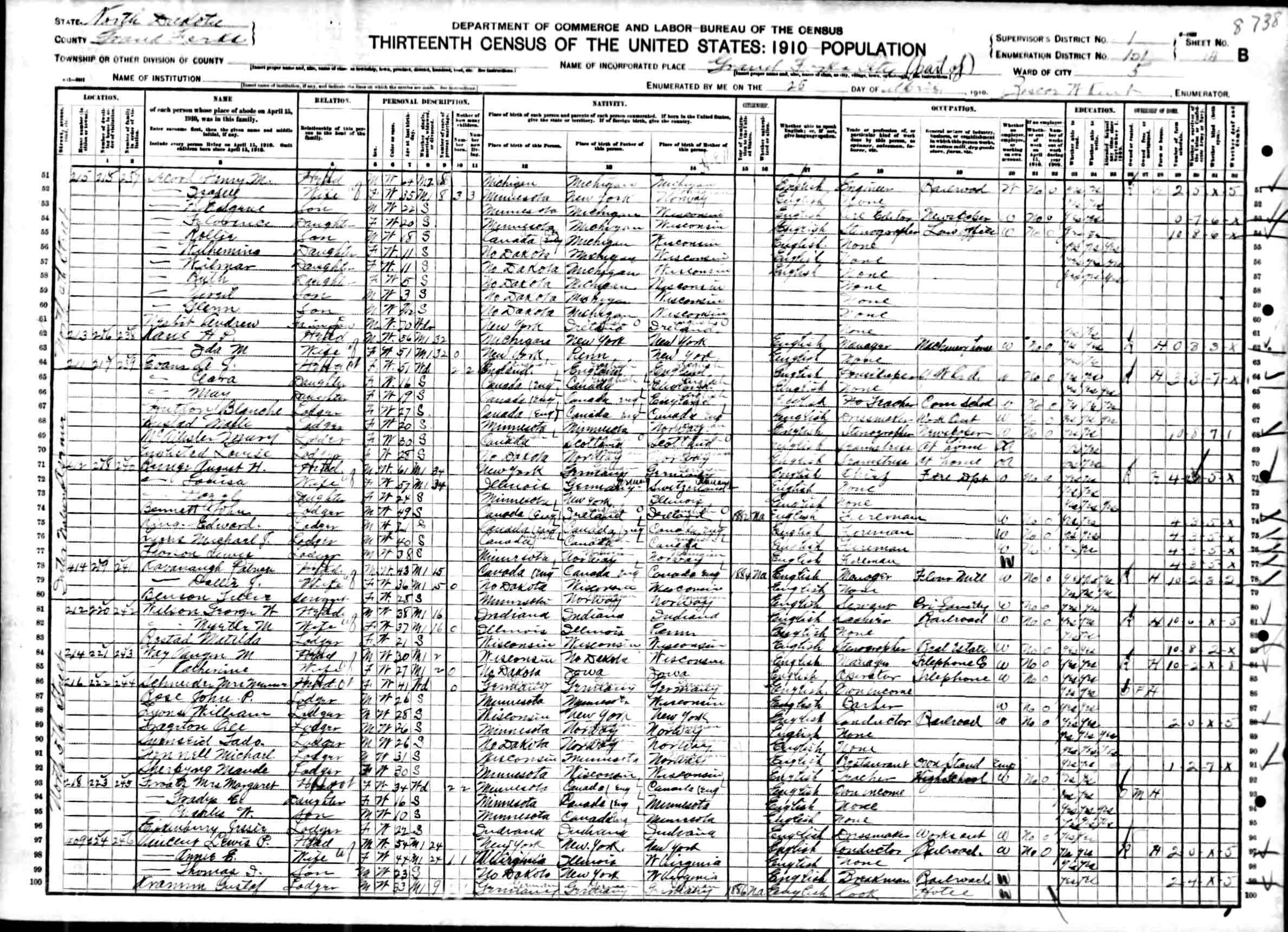
An example of a 1910 U.S. census form with August H. Runge

The original census enumeration sheets were microfilmed by the Census Bureau in the 1940s; after which the original sheets were destroyed. The microfilmed census is available in rolls from the National Archives and Records Administration. Several organizations also host images of the microfilmed census online, along with digital indices.

Microdata from the 1910 census are freely available through the Integrated Public Use Microdata Series. Aggregate data for small areas, together with electronic boundary files, can be downloaded from the National Historical Geographic Information System.
