= Runge =

Runge may refer to:

- Runge, Texas, United States
- Runge (crater), lunar crater in Mare Smythii
- Runge Newspapers, newspaper chain in Ontario, Canada
- Runge (surname)
