= The Hülsenbeck Children =

Painting by Philipp Otto Runge

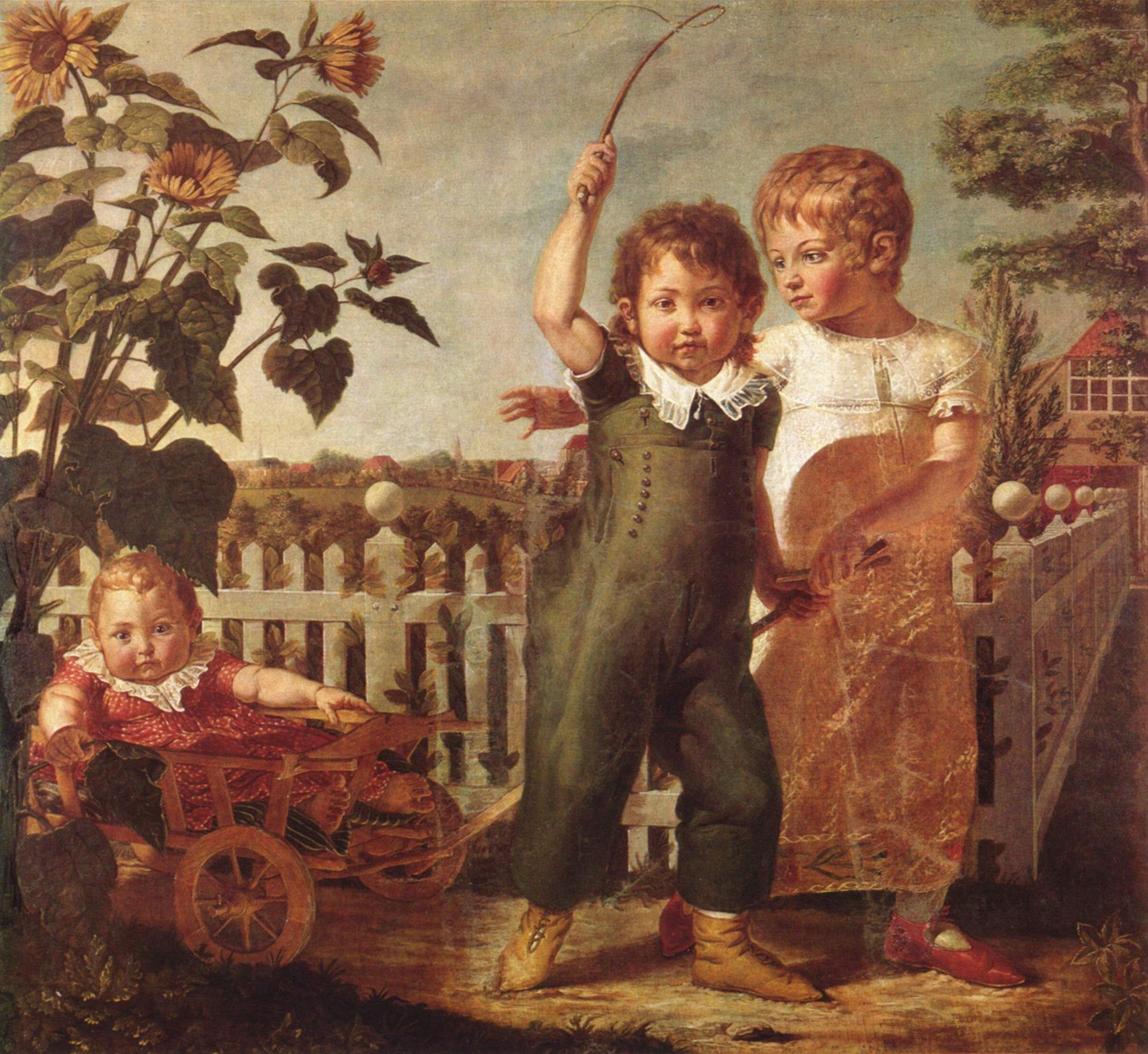
- Artist: Philipp Otto Runge
- Year: 1805–1806
- Medium: oil on canvas
- Dimensions: 131.5 cm × 143.5 cm (51.8 in × 56.5 in)
- Location: Kunsthalle Hamburg, Hamburg

The Hülsenbeck Children is an oil on canvas painting by the German artist Philipp Otto Runge, executed in 1805–1806. It is held in the Kunsthalle Hamburg.

== History and description ==
Runge had a short life, dying of tuberculosis at the age of 33, and this work is considered his masterpiece. He was staying at the time with his wife in his parental home in Wolgast when he was invited to portray the young family of Hamburg merchant Friedrich August Hülsenbeck, the business partner of his elder brother Daniel.

The painting depicts three of Hülsenbeck's children playing in the garden at their home in Eimsbüttel on the outskirts of Hamburg. It shows the three children, 5 year-old Maria, 4 year-old August and 2 year-old Friedrich, from their eye level living in their children's world and attempts to record their individual personalities. Treating children in this way, rather than as young adults clustered round the feet of their parents, was quite innovative at the time and helped to permanently change the way that children were depicted in German art.

== See also ==
- 100 Great Paintings, 1980 BBC series
