= August H. Runge =

American fire chief (1852–1921)

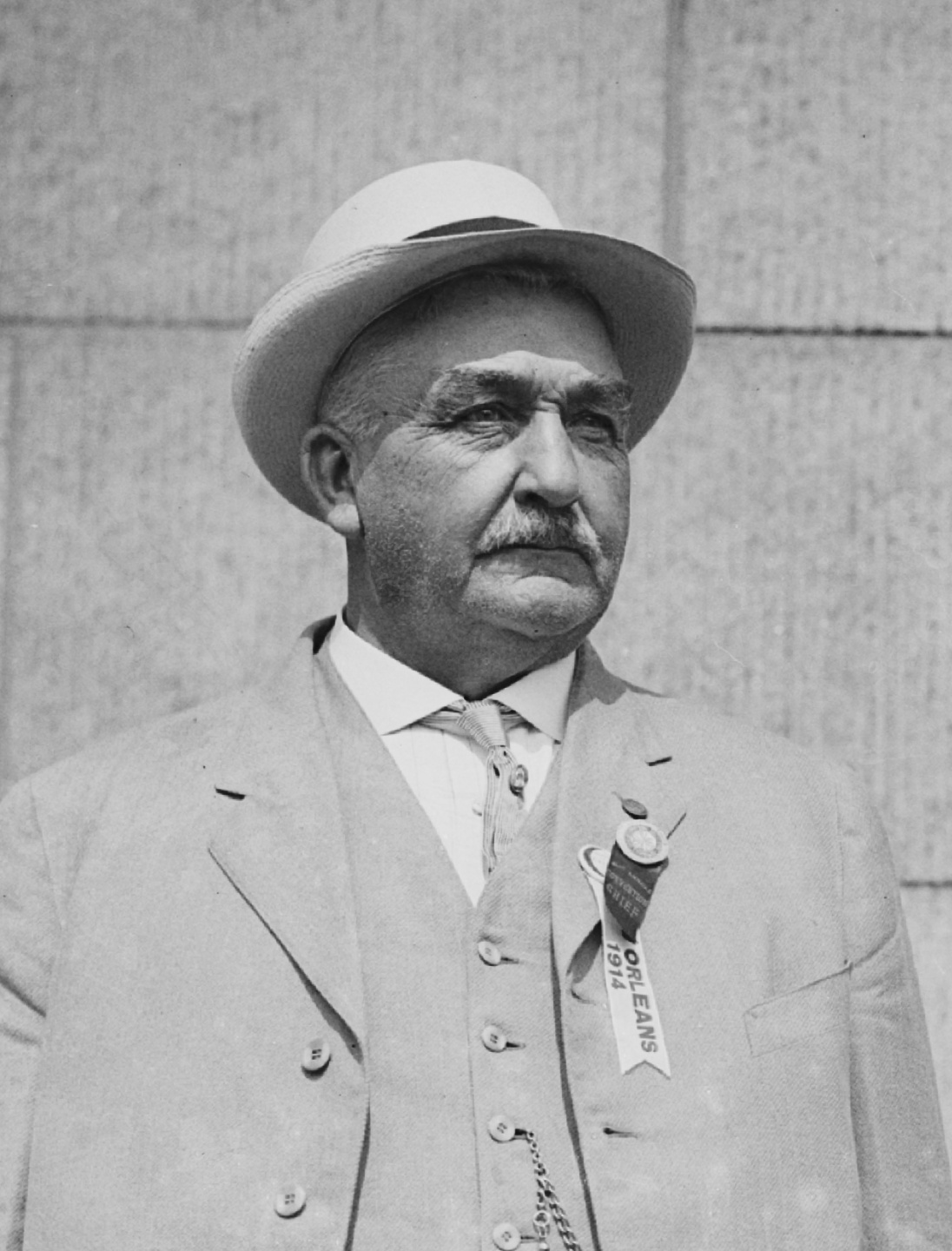
August H. Runge in 1913

August H. Runge (February 12, 1852 – September 9, 1921) was the Fire Chief of Minneapolis for 20 years. He then became the Fire Marshal for North Dakota and was involved in a North Dakota Supreme Court case Runge v. Glerum that forbade interfering with a fire marshal or police officer while on duty.

== Biography ==
Runge was born on February 12, 1852, in New York City. In 1864 he joined the U.S. Navy. In 1865 he was transferred to the Colorado, of the European squadron. In 1867 he was again transferred, this time to the Pacific contingent. Soon after he resigned and went to the Pennsylvania oil regions, where he studied mechanical engineering. In 1873 he returned to New York, and after a brief stay came to Minneapolis, where he took charge of the steam heating plant at the Minneapolis City Hall. While there, in 1874, he volunteered as a member of Hook and Ladder Company No. 1; was promoted to assistant foreman in 1878, and appointed by the city as foreman of the company in 1879. The same change in the force that affected the chief, on December 21, 1881, also influenced his career, and he was accordingly advanced to the position of 2d assistant chief.

He died in Los Angeles on September 9, 1921.
