= Nerly =

Nerly is a surname. Notable people with the surname include:

- Friedrich Paul Nerly, Italian-German painter
- Friedrich von Nerly (1807 – 1878), German painter
- Heru Nerly (1980 – 2021), Indonesian footballer
