= Friedrich Nerly =

Friedrich Nerly may be either

- Friedrich von Nerly (1807-1878), German painter, or
- Friedrich Paul Nerly (1842-1919), his son, German-Italian painter
