= Angermuseum =

Museum in Erfurt, Germany

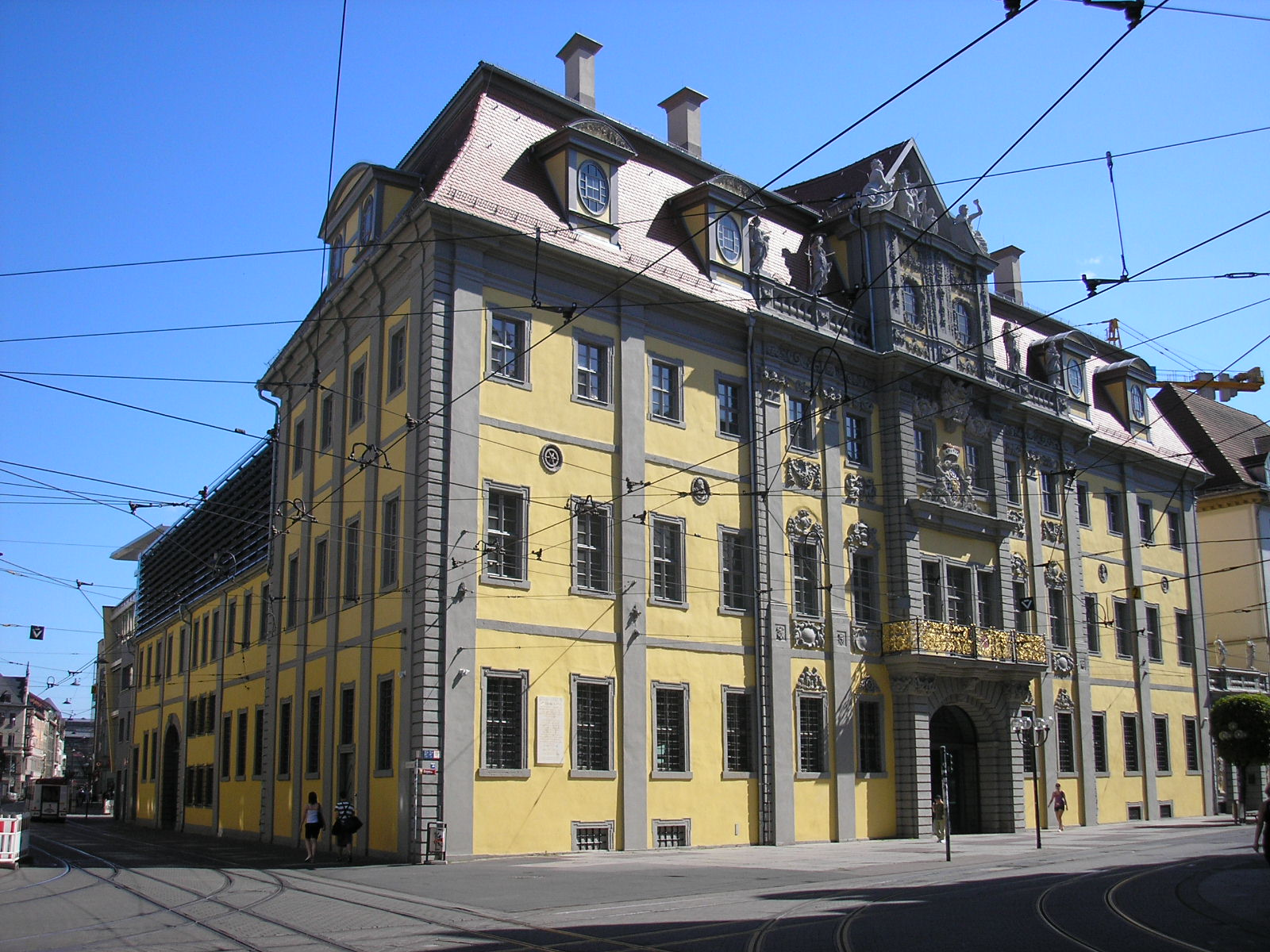
- The Angermuseum (March 2007, after the start of the construction work)
- Established: 1886; 140 years ago
- Location: Erfurt
- Coordinates: 50°58′32.2″N 11°2′3.1″E

The Angermuseum is an art museum in Erfurt opened on 27 June 1886.

== Building ==
It is housed in a building that used to house Erfurt's public weighing scales, where travelling merchants would bring their wares to be weighed for payment of the city's customs duties. The museum faces Anger square; Anger meaning a town common. Originally, only the gallery on the first floor was used for the museum. It was the first municipal museum in town. The building was constructed from 1706–1711. It was designed by the architect Johann Maximilian von Welsch. It is a Franconian–influenced baroque building with St. Martin, the city's patron saint, in its gable triangle.

== History ==
The extensive collection of works by the painter Friedrich von Nerly was donated to the city of Erfurt in 1883 by his son, Friedrich Paul Nerly, with the obligation to found a museum for the presentation of the collection. Friedrich von Nerly had emigrated to Venice in 1835 and afterwards had painted exclusively aquarelles and drawings of the city. More than 700 of the works created in Italy are part of the collection of the Angermuseum. Initially, the collection focused – inspired by the works of Friedrich Nerly – on landscape painting, portraits and still lifes from the 18th to 20th centuries. It is a special feature of the Angermuseum that the citizens here were involved in the expansion of the museum and not the princes as in Weimar and Gotha. Here – above all – families like the Lucius (Adelsgeschlecht) and the family Bankhaus Stürcke are to be mentioned. "The honorary class of wealthy and educated citizens" (in German: "Die Honoratiorenschicht aus Besitz– und Bildungsbürgern") determined the character and orientation of the museum for a long time.

In 1912 the later Reichskunstwart Edwin Redslob took over the management of the museum, afterwards Walter Kaesbach. Kaesbach was supported in acquiring new artistic works by the Jewish shoe manufacturer Alfred Hess, who supported the purchase of numerous then current works by painters such as Lyonel Feininger, Emil Nolde, Ernst Barlach, Gerhard Marcks, Max Pechstein and others and thus caused the Angermuseum's collection to become known as one of the greatest of German Expressionism. The museum experienced its heyday in the 1920s under the long-term director Herbert Kunze.

A famous example of the Expressionist collection at the time is the so-called "Heckelraum", which the artist Erich Heckel designed in 1922/24 with expressionist mural paintings under the motto "Stages of Life" (German: Lebensstufen). They rank among the "most important surviving murals of German Expressionism" (in German: "wichtigsten erhaltenen Wandbilder des deutschen Expressionismus") and can still be seen on the ground floor of the museum.

Through the National Socialists and their definition of Degenerate Art many works of the museum's collection of modern art at the time were destroyed or removed. Some works were also lost during the escape of the Hess family from Germany. It is the ambition of the museum to restore this collection. In autumn 2017, Christian Rohlfs' oil painting "Weiden II" (in English: "Willows II"), which had originally been in the museum since 1918, was acquired for 68,500 euros.

In 1935 the library moved out of the Angermuseum, which now had the entire building at its disposal. From 1944 the museum was closed down, the works of art were moved out because of the aerial war and thus saved from bombs and artillery fire. In 1976/77 the building was extensively reconstructed.

On 1 June 2010, after five years of renovation work, the museum was reopened as an art museum of the state capital Thuringia with the special exhibition "Natalya Goncharova. Zwischen russischer Tradition und europäischer Moderne" (in English: "Between Russian Tradition and European Modernity" in cooperation with the Stiftung Opelvillen Rüsselsheim and the Tretyakov Gallery in Moscow.

Today, the museum is supported by the Association of the "Freunde des Angermuseums" (in English: "Friends of the Angermuseum Association") and the "Verein für Kunst und Kunstgewerbe Erfurt" (in English: "The Association for Arts and Crafts Erfurt") and, in addition to the Gemäldegalerie, possesses extensive graphic and handicraft material.

== Collection focus ==
- Medieval collection: Erfurt and Thuringian Art of the Middle Ages, Sculpture, Painting, Craft Art

The collection of medieval art includes works from the heyday of Erfurt art in the second half of the 14th century, including four altarpieces from the St. Augustine's Monastery (Erfurt) and sandstone–sculptures from the workshop of the master of the Severisarcophagus. Eight panel paintings, among them the small panel "Christus als guter Hirte") (in English: "Christ as Good Shepherd") (around 1540/1550) and the paintings "Lasset die Kindlein zu mir kommen" (in English: "Let the little children come to me") (around 1535) and "Heilige Nacht" (in English: "Holy Night") (around 1540), and a winged altar are attributed to Lucas Cranach the Elder and the Cranach workshop.

- Collection of paintings: German paintings from the 18th century to the present day
- Graphic Collection: Graphics and drawings from five centuries

The collection consists of more than 30,000 works. In 2004, the Erfurt graphic artist Rudolf Franke, co-founder of the Erfurt studio community, donated 14,000 prints to the museum. Not only works by German artists can be seen, but also works by Czech and Slovak artists. In addition, works by "unadjusted" artists from the GDR such as Gerhard Altenbourg, Hermann Glöckner and Roger Loewig are in particular part of the collection.

- Arts and crafts collection: Faience, Glass, Porcelain, Furniture, contemporary Jewellery

The museum's glass collection comprises over 800 objects from more than eight centuries. However, at present only 122 objects can be seen in the permanent exhibitions. Among the most important works are the fragments from the Barfüßerkirche from the death of Francis (around 1250) and a disc with the Ritt der Heiligen Drei Könige (in English: "Ride of the Three Kings" (after 1350) from the gothic Brickchurche St.Marien in Salzwedel. The handicraft collection shows a multitude of historical Thuringian faiences. Furniture and musical instruments are also on display.

== Directors ==
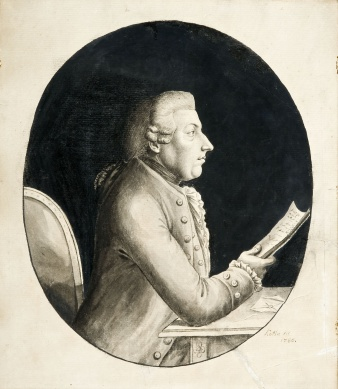
Picture of the merchant Christian Nonne; ink drawing by Franz Kotta, 1785, owned by the Angermuseum

- Alfred Overmann, 1901–1912
- Edwin Redslob, 1912–1919
- Walter Kaesbach, 1920–1924
- Herbert Kunze, 1925–1937
- Magdalene Rudolph, 1937–1945 provisional
- Herbert Kunze, 1945–1963
- Karl Römpler, 1963–1977
- Rüdiger Helmbold, 1977–1990
- Frank Nolde, 1990–1998
- Jörk Rothamel, 1998–1999
- Wolfram Morath-Vogel, 2000–2011
- Kai-Uwe Schierz, 2011–2024
- Elke Anna Werner, since May 2025

== Exhibitions ==
- 2011: Ein Jahrtausend Ivory vom 5. bis 15. Jahrhundert. In collaboration with the Hessisches Landesmuseum Darmstadt
- 2012: Tischgespräch mit Luther. Christliche Bilder in einer atheistischen Welt
- 2013: Henry van de Velde. Ein Universalmuseum für Erfurt,
- 2014: Beobachtung und Ideal. Ferdinand Bellermann. Ein Maler aus dem Kreis um Humboldt
- 2015: Widerschein – Die Farbfeldmalerin Christiane Conrad begegnet der Landschaftskunst des Angermuseums
- 2015: Kontroverse und Kompromiss: Der Pfeilerbildzyklus des Mariendoms und die Kultur der Bikonfessionalität im Erfurt des 16. Jahrhunderts
- 2015: Jacob Samuel Beck (1715–1778). Zum 300. Geburtstag des Erfurter Malers
- 2016: Hans Purrmann (1880–1966). Die Farben des Südens
- 2016: Ikonen. Das Sichtbare des unsichtbar Göttlichen
- 2017: Luther. Der Auftrag. Martin Luther und die Reformation in Erfurt
- 2017: Harald Reiner Gratz: Luthers Stein in Schmalkalden und andere Merkwürdigkeiten der deutschen Geschichte
- 2017: Helmuth Macke. Im Dialog mit seinen expressionistischen Künstlerfreunden
- 2018: Franz Markau (1881–1968) – Aspekte seines Lebenswerks
