= Carl Friedrich von Rumohr =

German historian, writer, draughtsman, painter, art collector and patron of artists

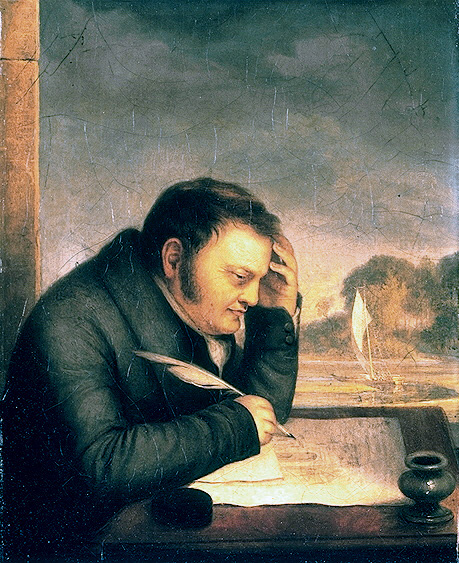
Portrait of Carl Friedrich von Rumohr by Friedrich von Nerly (ca. 1823–1827)

Carl Friedrich von Rumohr (6 January 1785, Reinhardtsgrimma – 25 July 1843) was a German art historian, writer, draughtsman and painter, agricultural historian, connoisseur of and writer about the culinary arts, art collector and patron of artists.

== Life ==
Carl Friedrich von Rumohr was born into an ancient aristocratic family and grew up on the family estates in Holstein near Lübeck. He went to the University of Göttingen 1802–1804 where he studied Classical philology with Christian Gottlob Heyne, History (Arnold Hermann Ludwig Heeren) and Mathematics (Bernhard Friedrich Thibaut); he took drawing lessons with Johann Dominik Fiorillo who also introduced him to Art history and the critical reading of Vasari. At university he came into contact with the Romantic movement around Ludwig Tieck and converted in 1804 to Catholicism together with the brothers Riepenhausen. Inheriting a large fortune after the death of his father he went with Tieck and the brothers Riepenhausen on a study trip to Rome (1805–1806) where he met the group of German artists (among others, Joseph Anton Koch) living and working there and acquired the foundations of his expertise of the classical arts. On his return journey he was introduced in Frankfurt to the circle around Clemens Brentano.

The following years he spent on his estates in Holstein while travelling extensively and meeting many personalities from the German cultural elite of his days. Of importance for the development of his thinking was his contact in the years 1806/1807 in Munich with the Naturphilosophie of Friedrich Wilhelm Joseph Schelling. He undertook studies at the Academy of Fine Arts, Munich and befriended the son of the director, Johann Peter von Langer. He made his first important contribution to Art history with the publication in 1812 of: Über die antike Gruppe Castor und Pollux ….

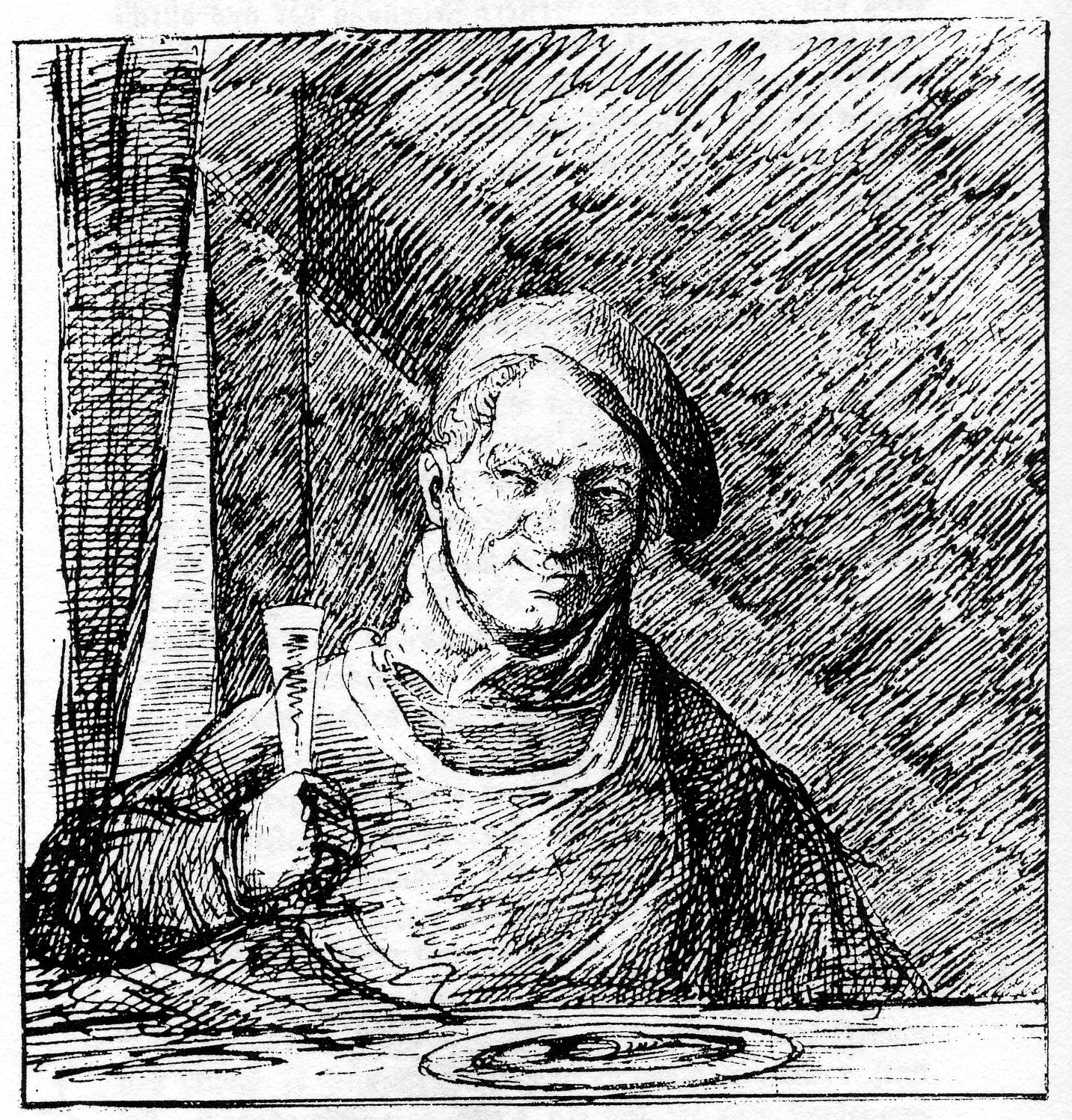
V. Rumohr: Drawing to Geist der Kochkunst (1822)

His second Italian journey (1816–1821) together with the painter Franz Horny took Rumohr to Florence and Siena for art historical archive studies and 1817 to Rome where he arranged for Horny to study with Joseph Anton Koch. He met the German painters of the Nazarene movement who had been living and working in Rome since 1810 and became an important patron, supporting them through publications and purchases until he broke with the younger artists around Johann David Passavant and Julius Schnorr. He acted as guide to the future Danish King Christian VIII in 1819 and again 1821 and also to the Bavarian crown prince Ludwig.

In 1822 Rumohr published under the name of his personal chef a treatise about the culinary arts, the Geist der Kochkunst von Joseph König., in praise and defence of traditional national (not just German) and provincial cuisine. It became his most successful book and was republished in an extended form in 1832. Recently it has been rediscovered and republished.

In the following years Rumohr was active as an elected honorary member of the newly founded Hamburger Kunstverein and advised and promoted many young Hamburg artists among them the brothers Otto and Erwin Speckter, Carl Julius Milde, Adolph Friedrich Vollmer and Christian Morgenstern. Being an able draughtsman himself, he supervised the artistic training of the young Friedrich Nerly. The relationship with their much older patron who tended to impose his strong views was, however, not always easy.

Out of his study of Vasari derived his main work, the Italienische Forschungen, the first two volumes of which were published in 1827. Its importance to Art history as discipline lies in the critical evaluation of historic documents. Wilhelm von Humboldt judged the work to be the first step towards a more truthful evaluation of Art objects [in their historic context]

Rumohr and the art historian Gustav Friedrich Waagen were involved as advisors in the planning of the Berliner Gemäldegalerie. The project of a public collection of old European masters had been initiated by the archaeologist Aloys Hirt (1759–1837) already in 1797 and had gained support from the architect Karl Friedrich Schinkel and the Prussian king Friedrich Wilhelm III. It was the first of its kind that had been conceived from an art historical perspective.

On his third Italian journey (1828–1829), accompanied by Nerly (who travelled further on to Rome), Rumohr negotiated purchases for the Berliner Gemäldegalerie, worked on a novel and acted as guide to the Prussian crown prince in Florence and Siena.

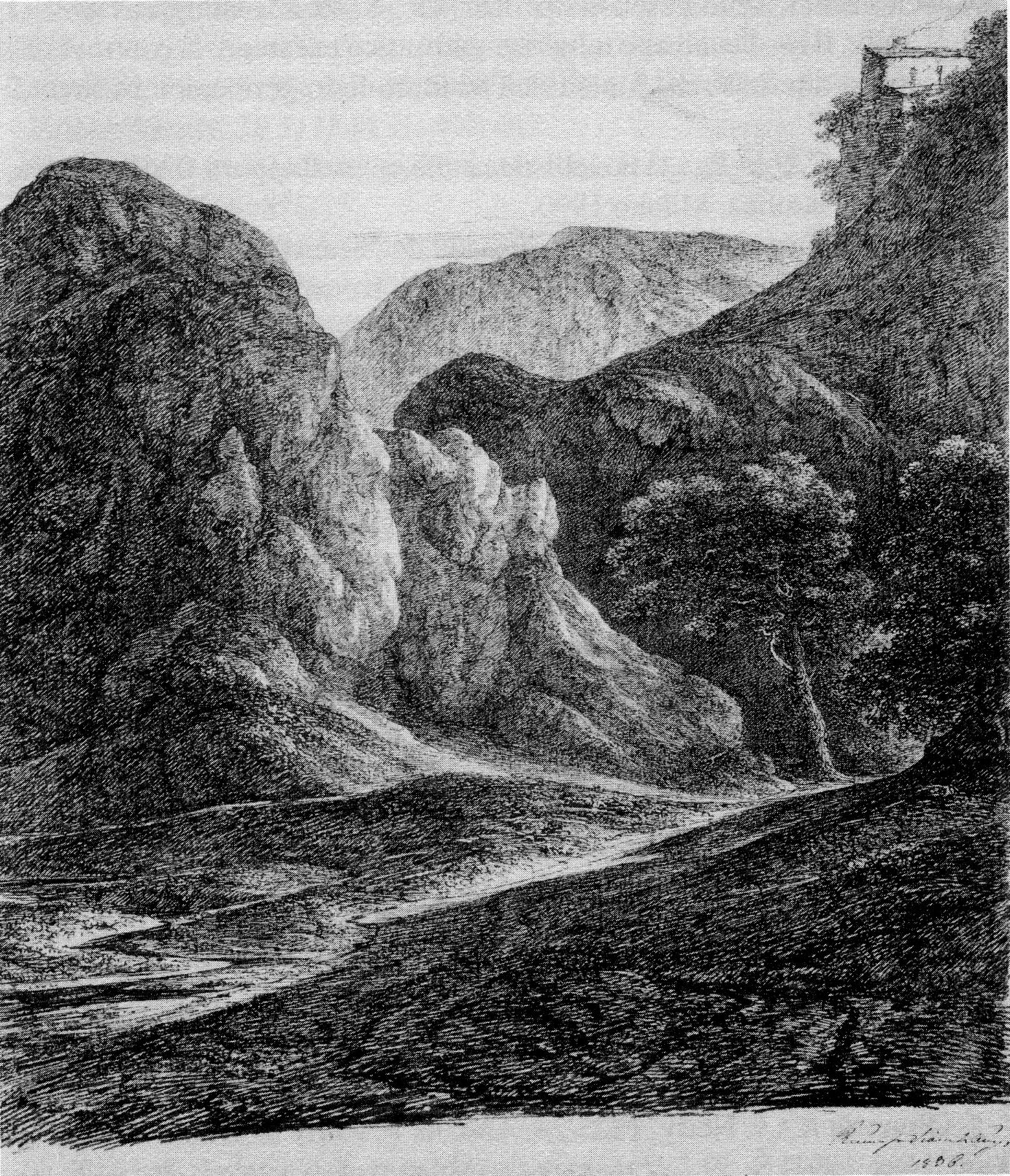
V. Rumohr: imaganary mountain landscape (1836)

In the following years Rumohr worked on essays and literary projects, some of them never published. The third volume of Italienische Forschungen came out in 1831; a critical review by Aloys Hirt leads to the breakup of their relationship and to several polemical essays. In the year 1834 he stayed in Copenhagen to catalogue together with Just Mathias Thiele the royal print collection; he was rewarded with the title of chamberlain and became patron to the young Danish painter Lorenz Frølich.

In spring of 1837 Rumohr went on his fourth Italian journey that led him to Milan and the surrounding region of Lombardy to study the traditional irrigation systems. He published his observations in: Reise durch die östlichen Bundesstaaten in die Lombardey with recommendations for their adoption in Prussia. On what will be his last trip to Italy in 1841 Rumohr visited his favourite student Nerly in Venice. Returning to Copenhagen he asked Christian VIII in vain for the position of keeper of the royal art collection; rejecting an offered lesser position he retired to spend his last years on his estates near Lübeck devoting himself to his art collection.

Rumohr died 1843 in Dresden. The physiologist, psychologist, medical practitioner and painter, Carl Gustav Carus had his death mask taken and performed an autopsy. He is buried in Dresden on the Innerer Neustädter Friedhof. Christian VIII donated his tombstone, Gottfried Semper designed it. It was destroyed in World War II and restored in 2010.

== Bibliography ==
=== Selected writings ===
- Über die antike Gruppe Castor und Pollux oder von dem Begriffe der Idealität in Kunstwerken. Perthes, Hamburg, 1812 Digitalisat der Ruprecht-Karls-Universität Heidelberg
- Italienische Forschungen. Nicolai’sche Buchhandlung, Berlin und Stettin, Teil 1–3
  - Erster Theil. 1827 deutschestextarchiv.de
  - Beigabe zum Ersten Bande. 1827 deutschestextarchiv.de
  - Zweyter Theil. 1827 deutschestextarchiv.de
  - Dritter Theil. 1831 deutschestextarchiv.de
- Geist der Kochkunst von Joseph König. Überarbeitet und herausgegeben von C. F. von Rumohr., 2., verm. u. verb. Aufl., Stuttgart und Tübingen 1832. SLUB Dresden
- Hans Holbein, der jüngere, in seinem Verhältnisse zum deutschen Formschnittwesen, Anstalt für Kunst und Literatur, Leipzig 1836 Google
- Zur Geschichte und Theorie der Formschneidekunst. Anstalt für Kunst und Literatur (R. Weigel), Leipzig 1837 SLUB Dresden
- Reise durch die östlichen Bundesstaaten in die Lombardey und zurück über die Schweiz und den oberen Rhein in besonderer Beziehung auf Völkerkunde, Landbau und Staatswirthscharft. Rohden’sche Buchhandlung, Lübeck 1838 SLUB Dresden

=== References ===
- Heinrich Wilhelm Schulz: Karl Friedrich von Rumohr, sein Leben und seine Schriften mit einem Nachwort von C. G. Carus, F. A. Brockhaus, Leipzig 1844 Google
- Gustav Paul Poel (1889). "Rumohr, Karl von" . Allgemeine Deutsche Biographie (in German). Vol. 29. Leipzig: Duncker & Humblot. pp. 657–661.
- Antonie Tarrach: "Studien über die Bedeutung Carl Friedr. v. Rumohrs für Geschichte und Methode der Kunstwissenschaft". In Monatshefte für Kunstwissenschaft 14 1921, Abhandlungen, Band I, S. 97–138. Internet Archive
- Gerhard Kegel: "Carl Friedrich von Rumohr". In Schleswig-Holsteinisches Biographisches Lexikon, hg. v. d. Gesellschaft f. Schleswig-Holstein. Geschichte, Bd. 3, Neumünster 1974, S.230-235.
- Schleswig-Holsteinische Landesmuseen (ed.): Friedrich Nerly und die Künstler um Carl Friedrich von Rumohr, Mainz, 1991.
- Gerhard Kegel (ed.): Carl Friedrich von Rumohr: Briefe an Johann Georg Rist, kommentiert und mit drei Nachträgen versehen, Buchholz/Nordheide: Selbstverl. d. Hrsg., 1993.
- Thomas M. Hauer: Carl Friedrich von Rumohr und Der Geist der bürgerlichen Küche. Universität Karlsruhe, Dissertation 2000
- Enrica Yvonne Dilk: Ein practischer Aesthetiker - Studien zum Leben und Werk Carl Friedrich von Rumohrs. Olms Verlag, 2000. ISBN 3-487-11053-9 Abstract
- Enrica Yvonne Dilk (2005). "Rumohr, Carl Friedrich Ludwig Felix von". Neue Deutsche Biographie (in German). Vol. 22. Berlin: Duncker & Humblot. pp. 250–251.
