= Rimon–Milgroim =

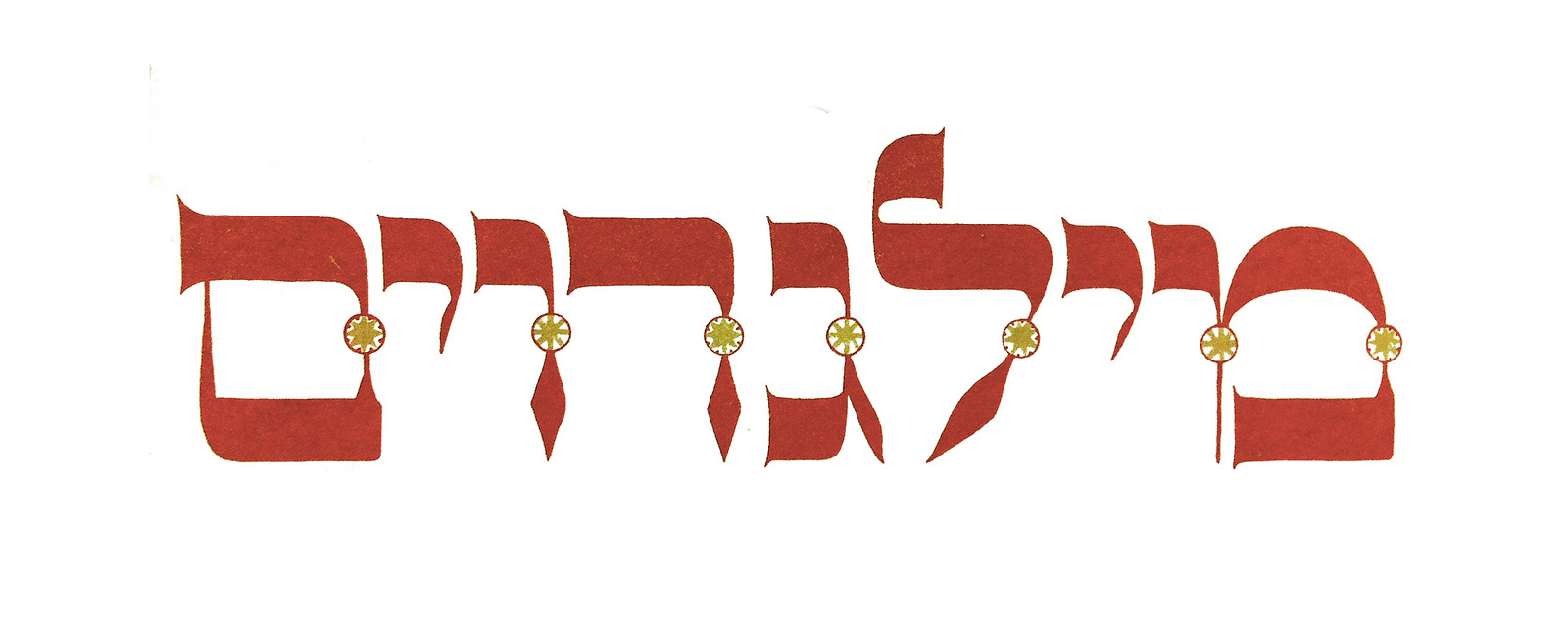
Logo by Franzisca Baruch

Milgroim. Journal for Art and Literature (Yiddish: מילגרױם: צײַטשריפֿט פאַר קונצט און ליטעראטור) was a Yiddish cultural magazine that was published between 1922 and 1924 in Berlin by Rimon. At the same time, the Hebrew language magazine Rimon was published in a similar format. Milgroym and rimon means "pomegranate" in Yiddish and Hebrew, respectively.

== History ==
Milgroim was founded by Mark Wischnitzer and Rachel Wischnitzer. Co-editors of the first issue were David Bergelson and Der Nister. Franzisca Baruch and Ernst Böhm designed magazine covers for both editions. Six issues were published, after which the publication was discontinued. The table of contents of the magazine was in Yiddish and in English, each article had a short summary in English. The advertisements for books were written in Russian or Hebrew.

The topics presented were taken from European art history and contemporary art, so there were essays on Leonardo da Vinci, Paul Cézanne and Max Liebermann as well as on Islamic art. Philosophical contributions dealt with Laozi, the Buddha, Hippolyte Taine, Hasidic Judaism, and Oswald Spengler. Translated to Yiddish was Der tote Gabriel by Arthur Schnitzler, excerpts from Arno Holz's Phantasus and Hugo von Hofmannsthal's Ballad of Outer Lifeprinted. The magazine provided space for the Yiddish contemporary poets David Bergelson, Dovid Hofshteyn, Moyshe Kulbak, Leib Kvitko, Der Nister, and Joseph Opatoshu.

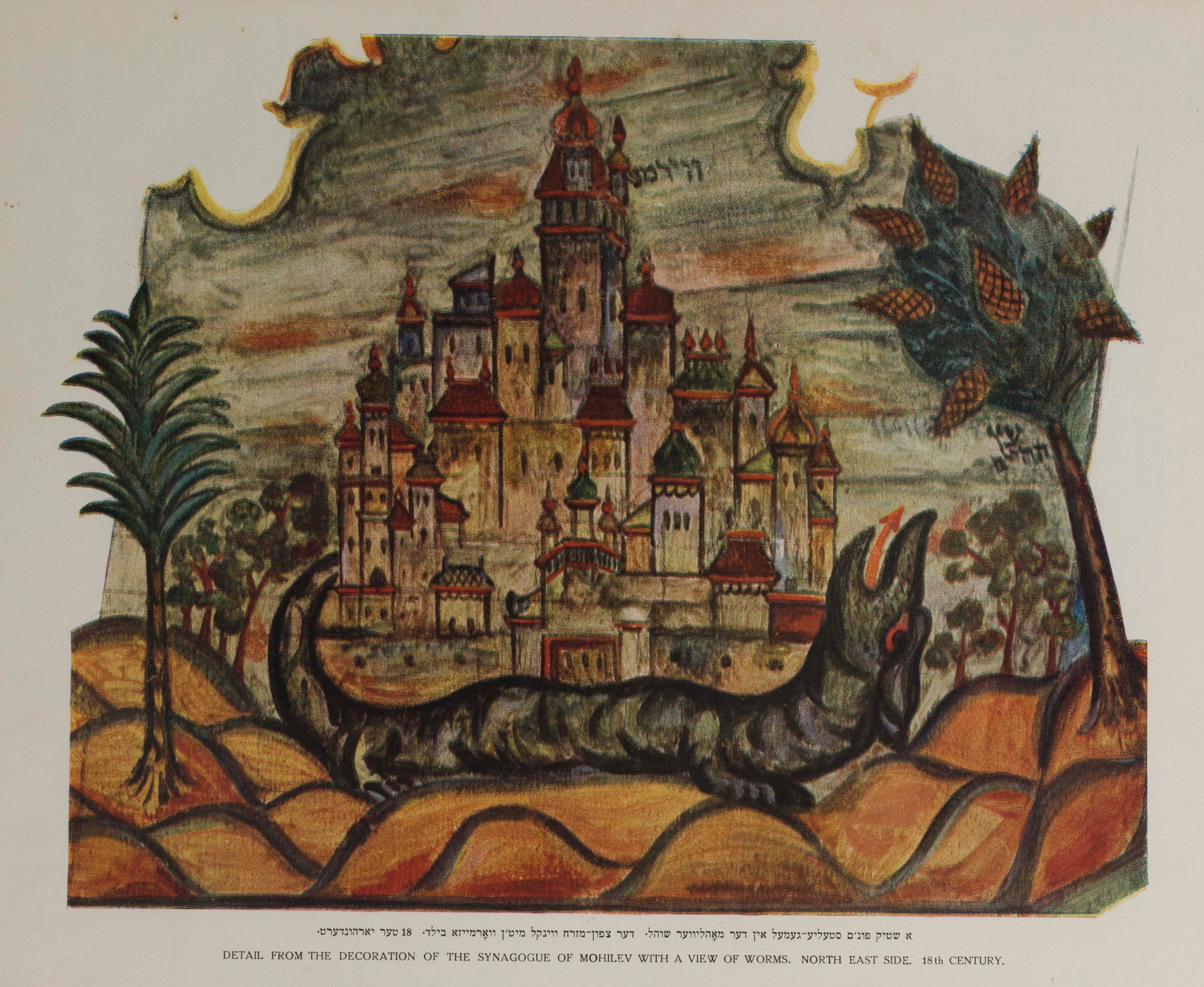
Cursed city of Worms, copy of the mural by El Lissitzky

The magazine had no direction, it was a broad forum for different currents, so it had no programmatic appeal in the first issue. In the first edition of Milgroim, Dovid Hofshteyn, who had also emigrated from the Soviet Union, described his feeling of disorientation with the "Lied meiner Indifferenz", which was printed in the same edition with the expressionist text "The Complete Awakening" (German: Der vollzogene Aufbruch). In the dispute about the direction of the magazine, der Nister and Bergelson withdrew after the first issue, while Rachel Wischnitzer propagated an art based on religion in the fourth issue.

Covers of the first and third issues featured El Lissitzky's paintings that he had copied from the murals of Cold Synagogue in Mogilev. Third issue also contained his article about that synagogue and a painting by Issachar Ber Ryback, with whom he together travelled to the shtetls in 1914. The article also contained a number of painting from the synagogue. Lissitzky wrote enthusiastically and emotionally describing elements of wall painting; here is his first impression of what he saw:

No, this was something different from that first surprise I received when I visited the Roman basilicas, the Gothic cathedrals, the Baroque churches of Germany, France, and Italy. Maybe, when a child awakens in a crib that is covered with a veil upon which flies and butterflies are sitting and the entire thing is drenched by the sun, maybe the child sees something like that.

Covers of Rimon and Milgroim

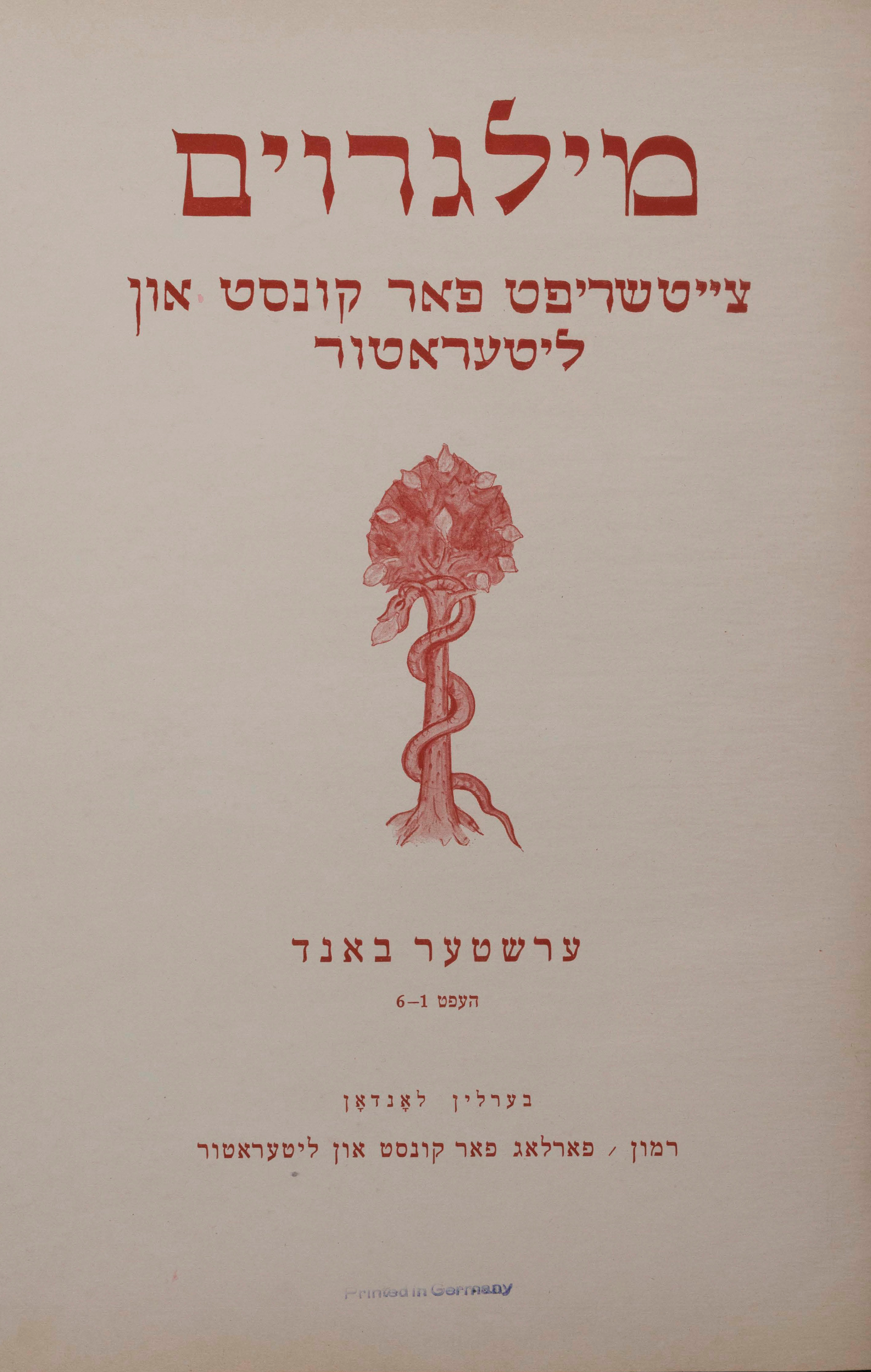
Milgroim #1, with a drawing by El Lissitzky

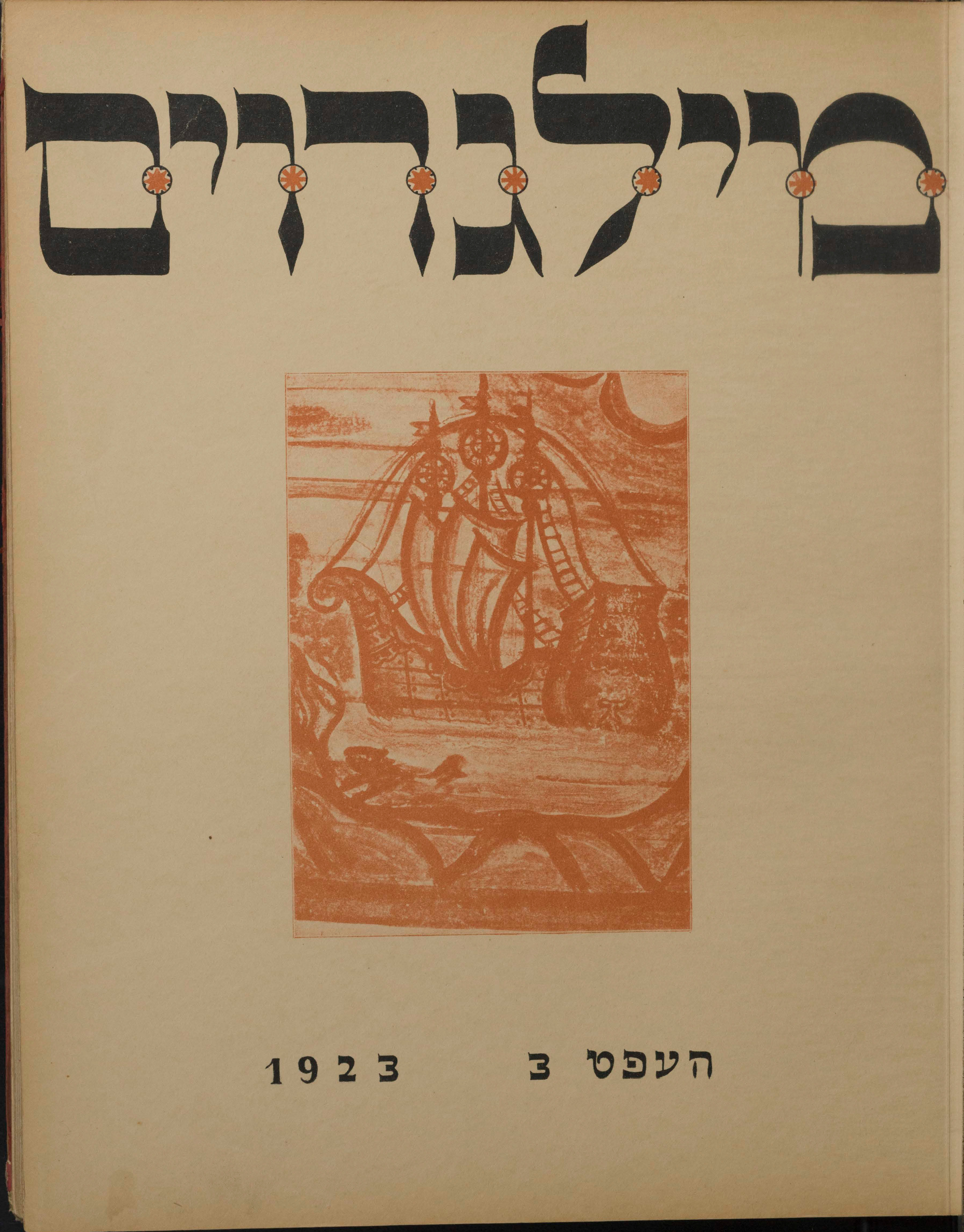
Milgroim #3, with a drawing by El Lissitzky

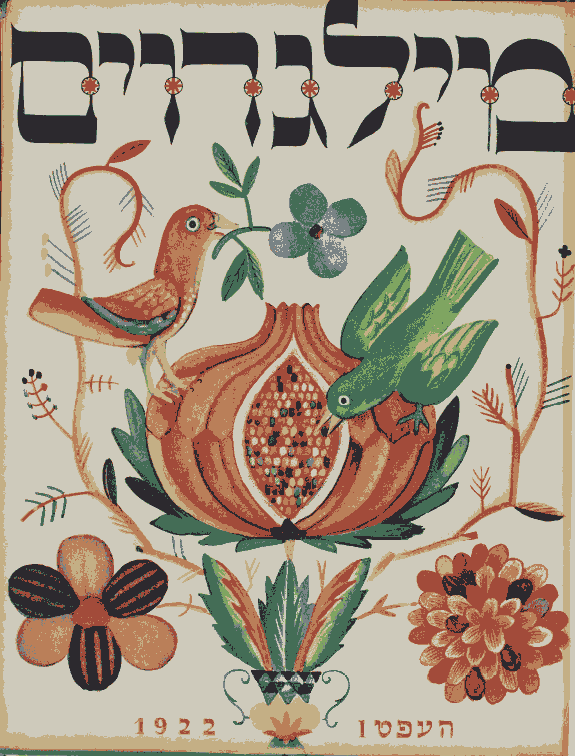
Milgroim #1, designed by Franzisca Baruch and Ernst Böhm

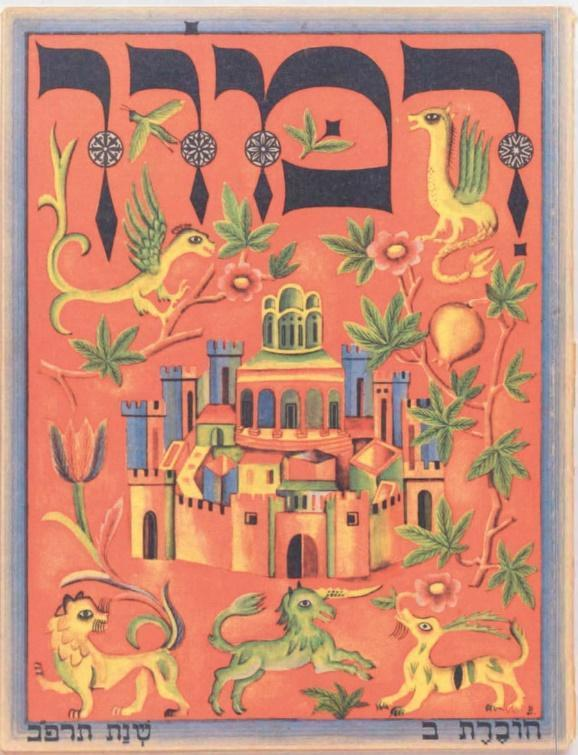
Rimon #2, by Baruch and Böhm

In addition to Milgroim, the Yiddish magazine Der Onheyb ("The Beginning"), edited by David Einhorn, Shemaryahu Gorelik and Max Weinreich, was founded in Berlin. Kalman Singman brought out a Yiddish Kunstring-Almanach to Berlin. The Yiddish Warsaw journal Albatros published a number in Berlin in 1923. In addition, the Yiddish-speaking organizations offered space to Poale Zion in Unzer Bavegung, the General Jewish Labour Bund in Dos Fraye Vort and the Association of Eastern Jews in Der Mizrekh Yid for feature sections and art contributions. From the centers of Yiddish culture in Eastern Europe, the supposed plan to establish a new center of Yiddish culture in Berlin was sharply criticized. In fact, the publishers and most of the Yiddish authors returned to the countries of their readers in Vilnius, Warsaw, Moscow, Kiev and Odessa in the 1920s, and the Berlin cultural magazines were discontinued.
