= Carl Julius Milde =

German painter (1803–1875)

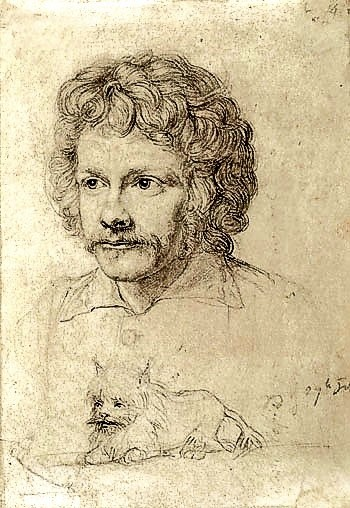
Carl Julius Milde, by Erwin Speckter

Carl Julius Milde (16 February 1803, in Hamburg – 19 November 1875, in Lübeck) was a German painter, curator and art restorer.

== Life ==
His father was a grocer whose business had been nearly ruined by the French Occupation. After a financially difficult youth, his desire to improve himself led to art lessons with Gerdt Hardorff and Siegfried Bendixen and a lasting association with the artistic family of Johannes Michael Speckter. Later he, Otto Speckter and Erwin Speckter toured Northern Germany with the support of art historian Carl Friedrich von Rumohr. They were all most impressed with the old Hanseatic city of Lübeck. On Rumohr's advice, Milde went to study at the Dresden Academy of Fine Arts in 1824. Later, he studied briefly at the Academy of Fine Arts, Munich, followed by a visit to Italy.

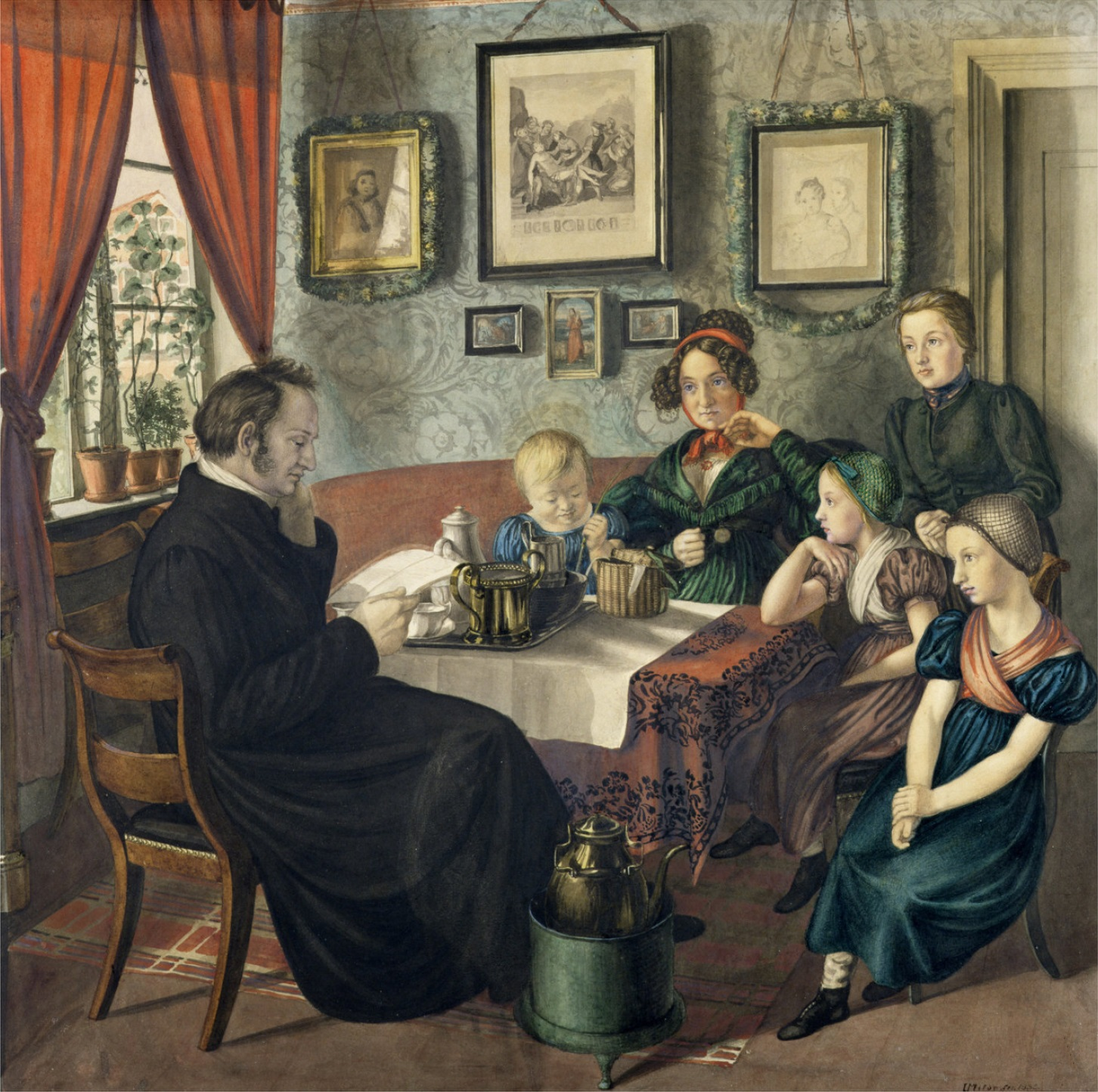
Pastor Rautenberg and His Family (1833)

From 1830 to 1832, he returned to Italy, visiting every major city, but staying longest in Rome, where he came under the influence of Friedrich Overbeck and the Nazarene movement. Although he continued to travel, Hamburg remained his home for most of the 1830s, making a name for himself with portraits and church paintings. In 1835, he completed a series of frescoes at the Mayor's official residence, which had been started by his friend Erwin Speckter but left incomplete at the latter's early death. As an amateur scientist and naturalist, he also illustrated several medical/anatomical texts.

=== Career in Lübeck ===
In 1838, shortly after getting married, he moved to Lübeck where he took a position as a drawing instructor at the Katharineum and became a Professor in 1841. He also pursued his scientific hobbies, documenting and cataloguing items for the Lübecker naturhistorische Museum, where he served as a curator for thirty years. Among his more interesting projects was helping to assemble the museum's first gorilla skeleton.

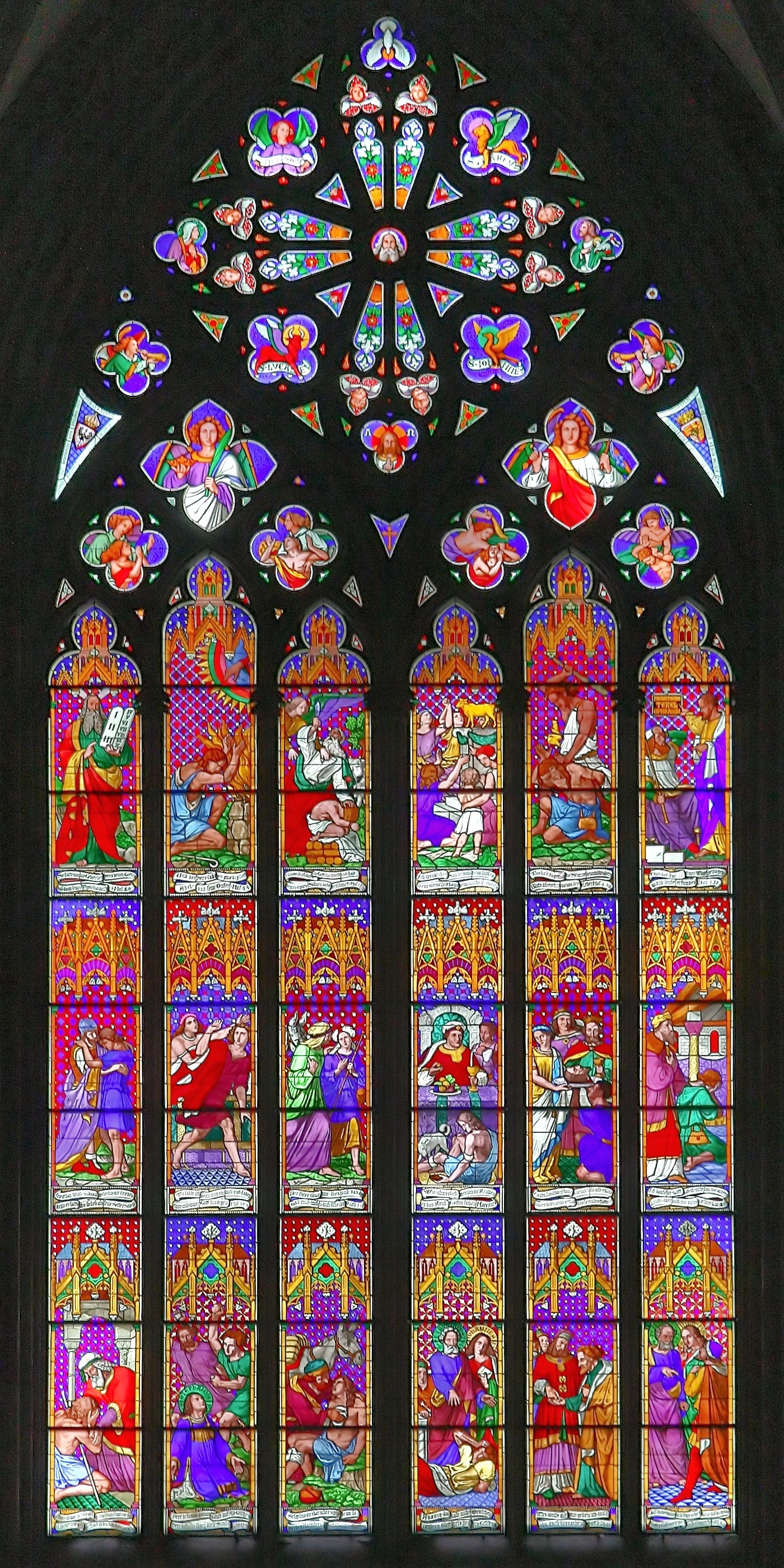
Cologne Cathedral dome: the west window

Increasingly though, his focus turned to documenting and saving the city's artistic and architectural heritage. He concentrated on the rescue and restoration of Medieval interior pieces and stained glass, laying a foundation for the collection of altarpieces at St. Anne's Museum. In 1865, while working at the Hofkirche in Semlow, he attracted the attention of Crown Prince Frederick and was commissioned to work on the windows between the towers at Cologne Cathedral.

Despite increasing senility during his last six years of life, he continued to work and serve in all of his official capacities. His many collections are still preserved at their respective institutions in Lübeck. A street in Hamburg's Barmbek-Nord district is named after him.

== Books ==
- Denkmäler bildender Kunst in Lübeck, drawn and published by C. J. Milde with explanatory historical text by Ernst Deecke, two volumes, Lübeck, Self-published 1843–1847.
- Lübecker ABC, 26 etchings by C. J. Milde, Bollmann, Lübeck, Self-published 1857 (2nd. ed. Grautoff, 1873; 3rd. ed. Nöhring, 1926).
- Aus Lübecks alten Tagen, Verlag Bernhard Nöhring, Lübeck 1908. Later editions include anecdotes by Otto Anthes.
