= Carl Milde =

Carl Milde may refer to:

- Carl Julius Milde (1803–1875), German painter, curator and art restorer
- Carl August Julius Milde (1824–1871), German bryologist and pteridologist
