= Heinrich Joachim Herterich =

German lithographer, painter and etcher (1772–1852)

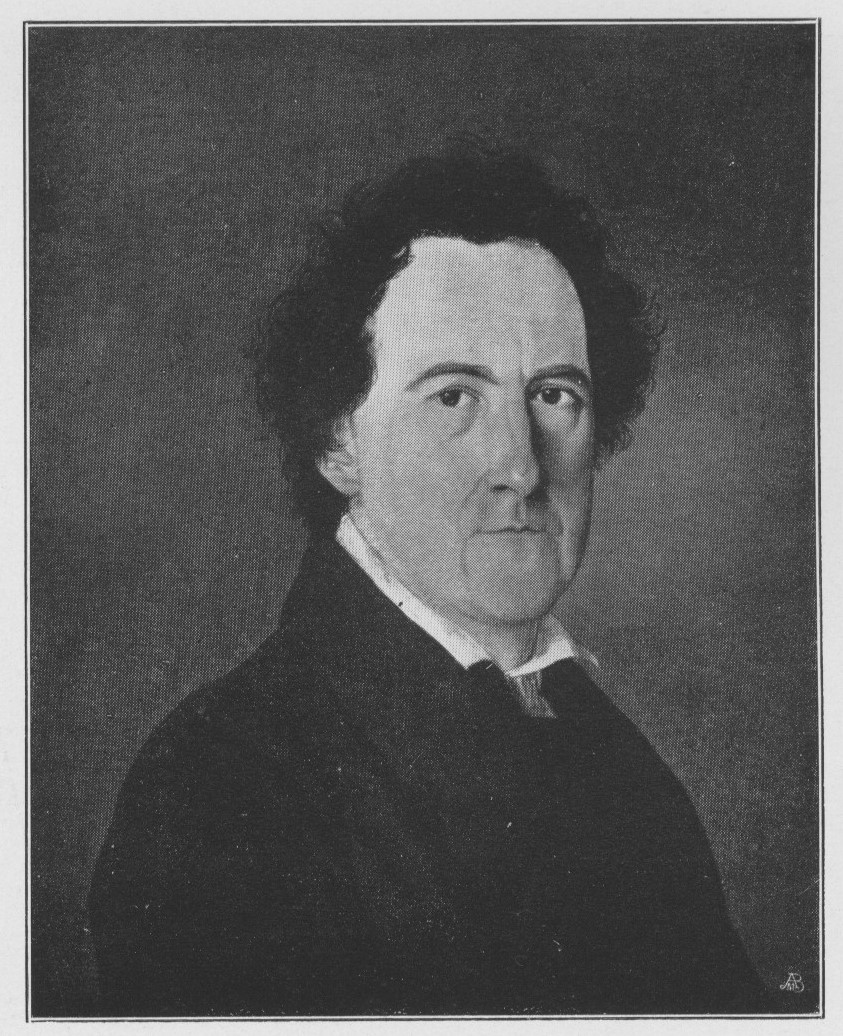
- Heinrich Joachim Herterich; portrait by Erwin Speckter (1824)
- Born: 1772; Hamburg, Germany
- Died: March 20, 1852 (aged 79–80); Hamburg, Germany
- Resting place: Ohlsdorf Cemetery
- Occupations: Painter, Lithographer, & Etcher
- Father: Johann Andreas Herterich

Heinrich Joachim Herterich (May/June 1772, Hamburg – 20 March 1852, Hamburg) was a German lithographer, painter and etcher.

== Life and work ==
He studied with his father, Johann Andreas Herterich (1725–1794), who was originally from Bayreuth. In 1804, he made a study trip to Paris. Initially, he worked as a portrait painter, in a style influenced by Claude Lorrain.

He learned lithography in 1817, from Johann Michael Mettenleiter, in Munich. The following year, he returned to Hamburg with a team of specialists, in a joint venture with Johannes Michael Speckter, to establish the first lithography firm in Northern Germany. The company proved to be very successful, although Herterich personally continued to prefer painting to lithography. In 1825, he helped to set up a "Lithographic Institute" in Berlin, modelled after the one in Munich.

He remained closely connected to the Speckter family until his death; serving as a teacher for his partner's sons, Erwin and Otto.

He was interred at the Ohlsdorf Cemetery, adjacent to the plot belonging to the Speckters.
