= Friedrich von Nerly =

German painter

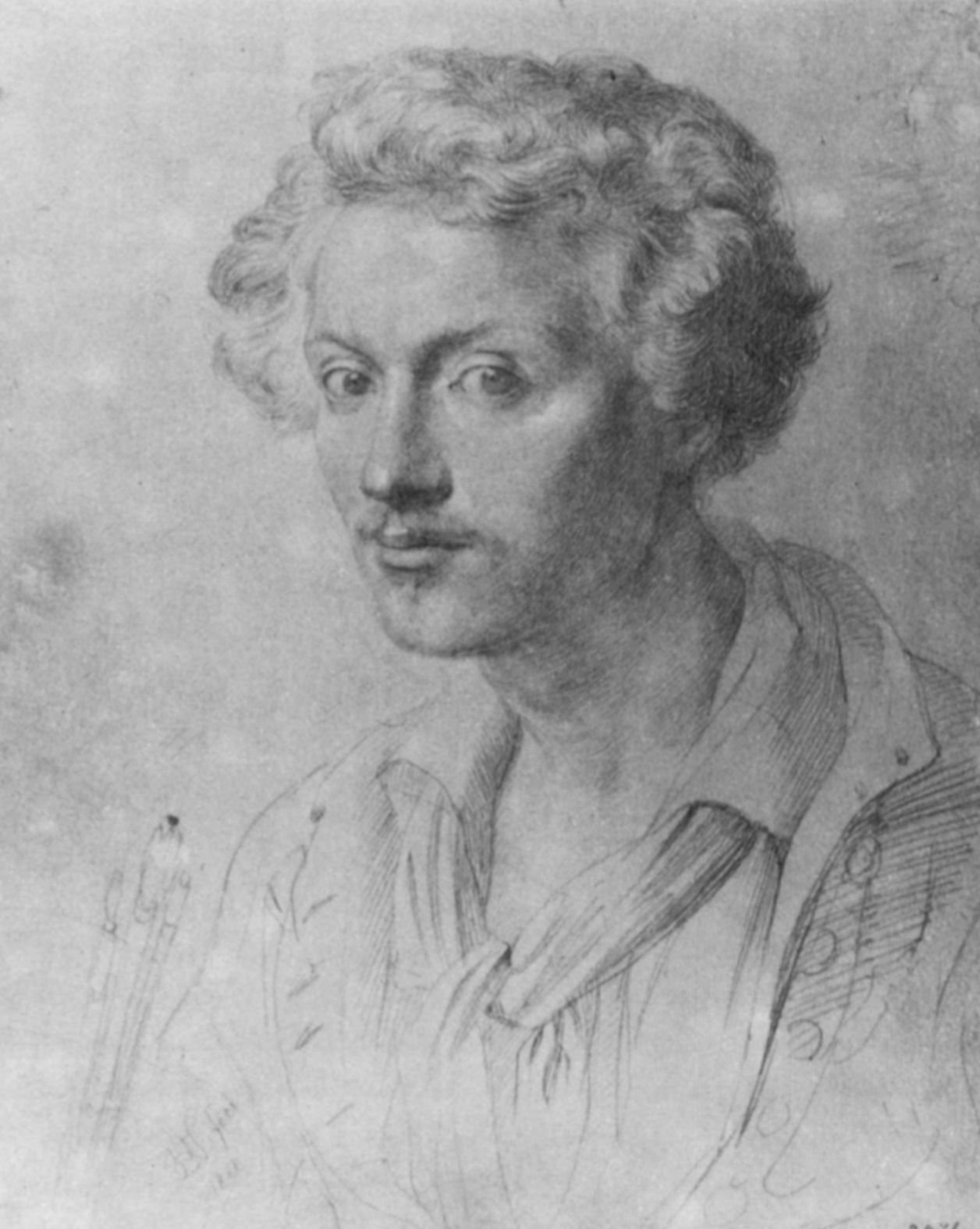
Self-portrait (1828)

Friedrich von Nerly, originally Christian Friedrich Nehrlich (24 November 1807, Erfurt - 21 October 1878, Venice) was a German painter in the Romantic Style; primarily known for his vedute of Venice. He is sometimes referred to as "The Elder", to distinguish him from his son, the painter Friedrich Paul Nerly. His first name is also seen as "Federico" and "Federigo".

== Career ==
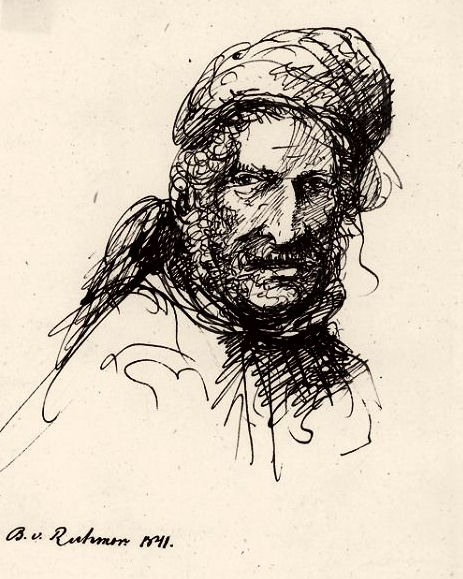
Kopfstudie drawing by C. F. von Rumohr (1841)

His father, a postal official in Erfurt, died while Friedrich was still a boy. From 1815, he was raised by an uncle, who was a musician, in Hamburg. He received his first drawing lessons from his aunt, then from another uncle, Heinrich Joachim Herterich, a lithographer, and was employed in his workshop. He also made friends with Herterich's partner, Johannes Michael Speckter, and his family. Through them, he made the acquaintance of the person who would become his patron; the painter and art historian, Carl Friedrich von Rumohr. In 1823, he became one of Rumohr's students. Four years later, they took an extended trip that led to Italy, through the Harz Mountains.

At the end of 1828, they reached Rome in Italy and he decided to stay there. It was then that he changed his name to "Nerly", apparently believing it sounded more Italian. He soon took over managing the "Cervaro" for the Deutscher Künstlerverein (German Artists' Association) in Rome. He would hold that position until his departure in 1835. After a short tour of Southern Italy, he settled in Venice and began painting the views of the city for which he is best known. In 1840, he married Agathe Alginovich (1810-1889), adoptive daughter of the Marchese Maruzzi, and they had one son, Friedrich Paul Nerly, who also became a painter.

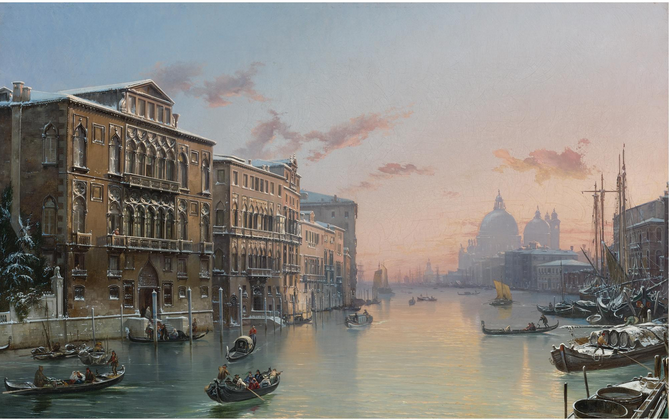
A Winter View of the Grand Canal

In 1852, King William I of Württemberg awarded him the Knight's Cross in the Order of the Crown, which gave him the right to use the noble prefix "von". In 1883, his entire art collection was donated to the city of Erfurt by his son, with the stipulation that it be used to create a museum. This was done as required, and the Angermuseum opened in 1886. A street in Erfurt is named after him. He is buried in the Protestant section of the San Michele cemetery.
