= Magdalene Rudolph =

German art historian

Magdalene Rudolph, also known as Magdalene Kunze (1901–1992) was a German art historian and from 1937 until 1945 served as provisional Director of the Angermuseum in the German city of Erfurt.

== Career ==
Rudolph was born in 1901. She studied art history in Munich, where she completed her doctorate in 1930 with a dissertation on Erfurt's 15th century stone sculpture (Die Erfurter Steinplastik des 15. Jahrhunderts).

From 1934 onwards she was working for the Angermuseum (then known as the Städtische Museum or Municipal Museum) and during second world war became its provisional director, following Herbert Kunze, who had been removed from office by the local Nazi authorities.

=== Preservation of the Heckelraum ===
Magdalene Rudolph is most notable for preserving the so-called "Heckelraum" of Angermuseum. The space that was designed and decorated by artist Erich Heckel between 1922 until 1924 with the expressionist monumental mural paintings "Lebensstufen" (Stages of Life).

When Erfurt citizens who supported the National Socialists' view of Heckel's works as degenerate art, they threatened to storm and destroy the so called "Schreckenskammer" (Chamber of Horrors). Rudolph had the room closed off with a hastily erected wall. She placed a sculpture of St. Gabriel in front of the only door.

The Heckelraum subsequently fell into oblivion and was only rediscovered after the war - the only preserved monumental mural paintings of German Expressionism.

=== After World War II ===
Herbert Kunze and Rudolph later married. It is said, that she sometimes let him visit his former place of work during the night. After the war, Herbert Kunze was reinstalled as director of the museum. The couple continued their work for the museum together, successfully curating numerous exhibitions, until in 1963, Herbert Kunze was again made to resign from his post for political reasons.

Magdalene Rudolph continued to work for the museum until her retirement in 1971.

She died in 1992.

== Literature ==
- Cornelia Nowak (2009), "Magdalene Rudolph (Kunze)", in Ernst Herrbach (ed.), Der Erfurter Kunstverein: Zwischen Avantgarde und Anpassung; eine Dokumentation von 1886 Bis 1945 (in German), Erfurt: Angermuseum, p. 224, ISBN 978-3-930013-14-2
- Klostermann, Beate (2007), Die Sonderausstellungen des Angermuseums von 1945 bis 1962. Eine rezeptionsästhetische Analyse. Dissertation (in German), Universität Erfurt
