= Erwin Speckter =

German painter (1806-1835)

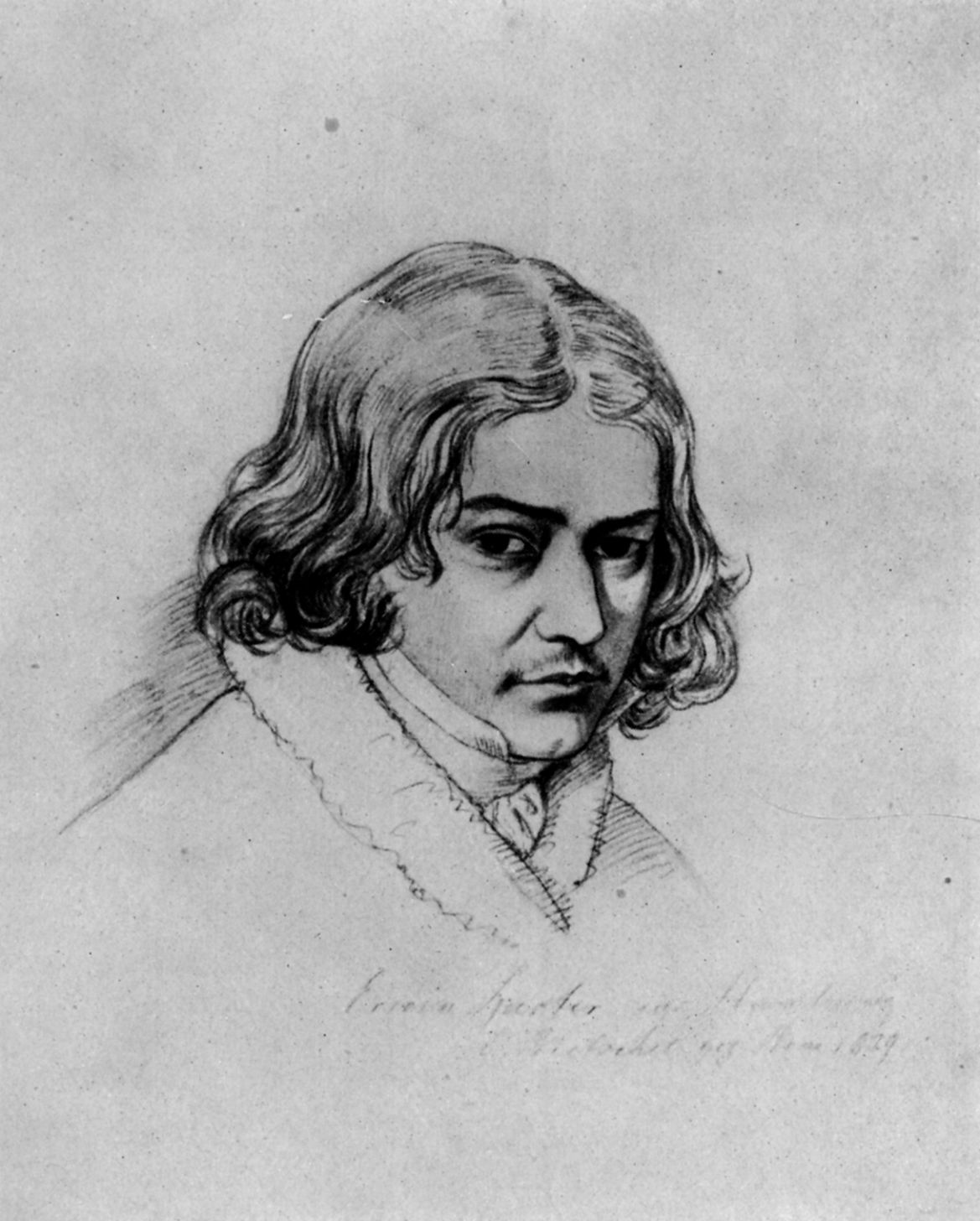
Erwin Speckter (1829), portrait by Ernst Rietschel

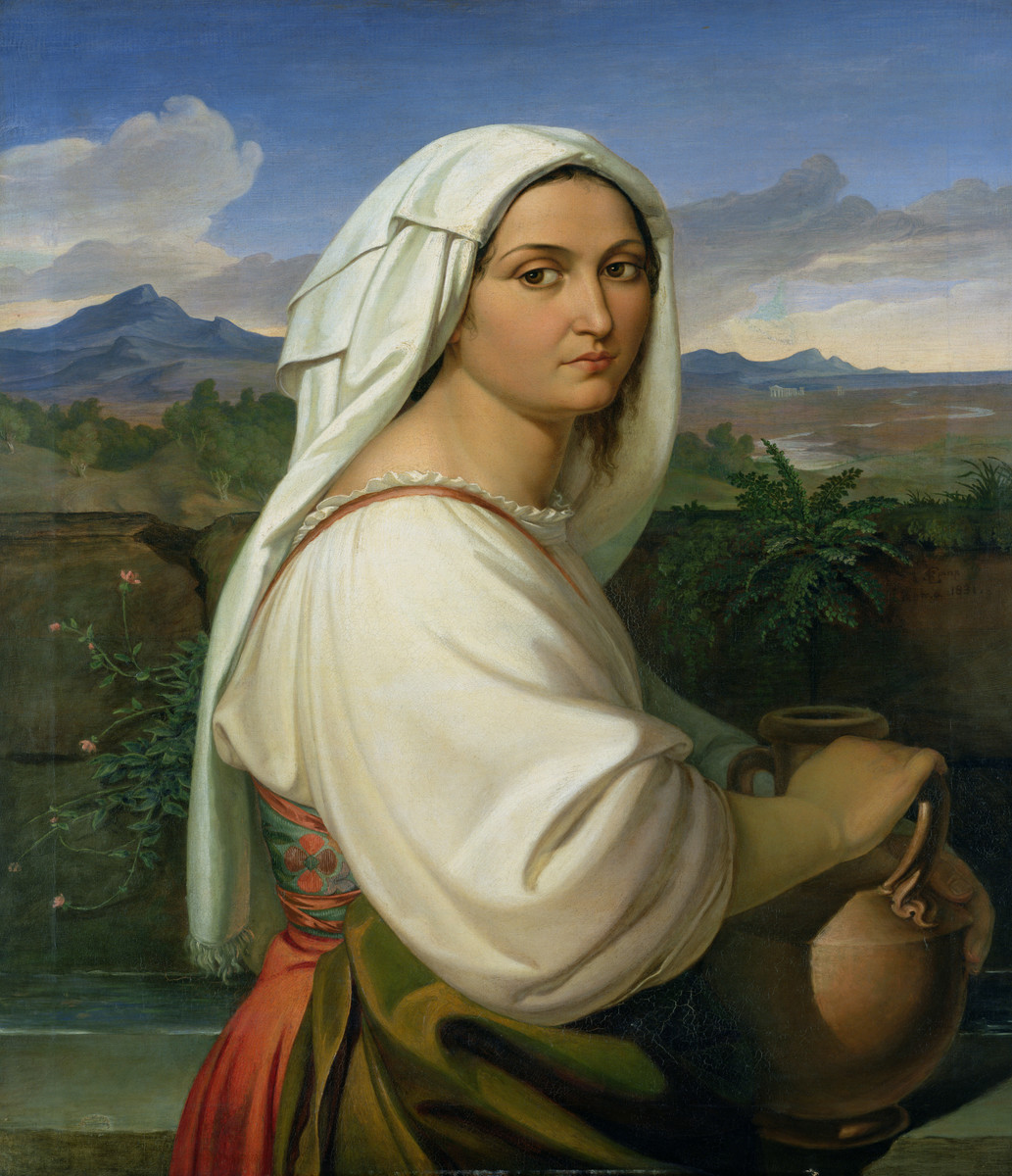
An Albanian Woman (1831)

Erwin Speckter (18 July 1806, Hamburg - 23 November 1835, Hamburg) was a German painter, often associated with the Nazarene movement.

== Life ==
His father was the lithographer, Johannes Michael Speckter. During the Siege of Hamburg, his family sought refuge at the estate of a local banker. Another lithographer, Heinrich Joachim Herterich, was living there at the time and his collection inspired Erwin's first interest in art. His father provided some of his first painting lessons, along with the local artist Friedrich Carl Gröger, while he attended a famous private school operated by Leonhard Wächter.

In 1823 (with the support of Carl Friedrich von Rumohr) he, his brother and Carl Julius Milde, another aspiring painter, travelled through Northern Germany, studying the ancient monuments, but he was also influenced by seeing the works of Friedrich Overbeck in Lübeck. Two years later, he studied in Munich with Peter von Cornelius and assisted him with his decorations for the loggia at the Alte Pinakothek.

This reinforced his artistic inclinations which, upon his return home, were further subjected to the influence of a meeting with Philipp Otto Runge, and manifested themselves in paintings he did for a local estate in Hamm. This was followed by a four-year stay in Italy (mostly Rome), where he devoted himself largely to religious paintings, although he produced many drawings as well. Once again returning to Hamburg in 1834, he began putting his new ideas to work, designing frescoes for the Mayor's official residence. During this work, his asthma (which had plagued him for years) grew worse and the attacks became more frequent. He died soon after, before the work could be completed.

His Briefe eines deutschen Künstlers aus Italien (Letters from Italy by a German Painter) were published posthumously by his brother-in-law, the Professor Christian Friedrich Wurm. (2 Volumes, Leipzig 1846).

His brother, Otto Speckter, became a well-known illustrator.
