= Edwin Redslob =

German art historian (1884-1973)

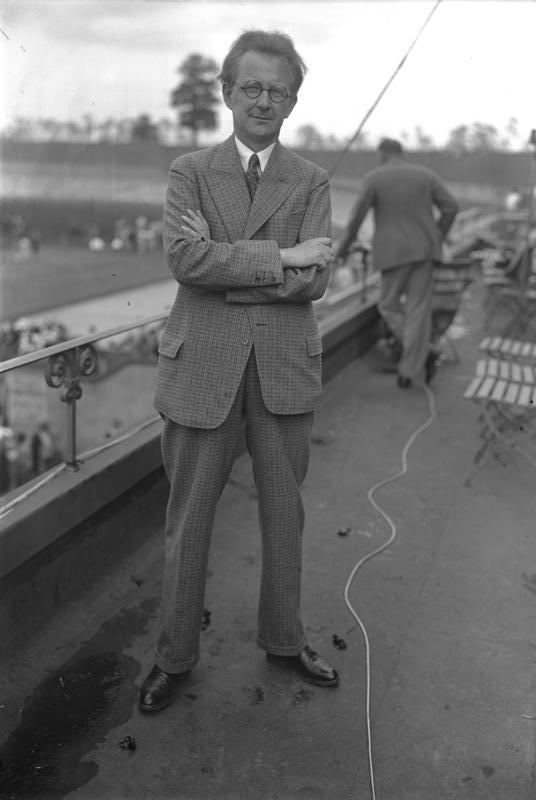
- Edwin Redslob
- Born: 22 September 1884; Weimar, German Empire
- Died: 24 January 1973 (aged 88); West Berlin, West Germany
- Occupation: Art historian

Edwin Redslob (22 September 1884, Weimar – 24 January 1973, West Berlin) was a German art historian and art collector who served as Reichskunstwart under the Weimar Republic. Appointed in 1920, he held the position until it was abolished after the Nazis came to power in 1933.

In 1912, he was appointed to run the Angermuseum in Erfurt where he remained until 1919.

He was an art collector.

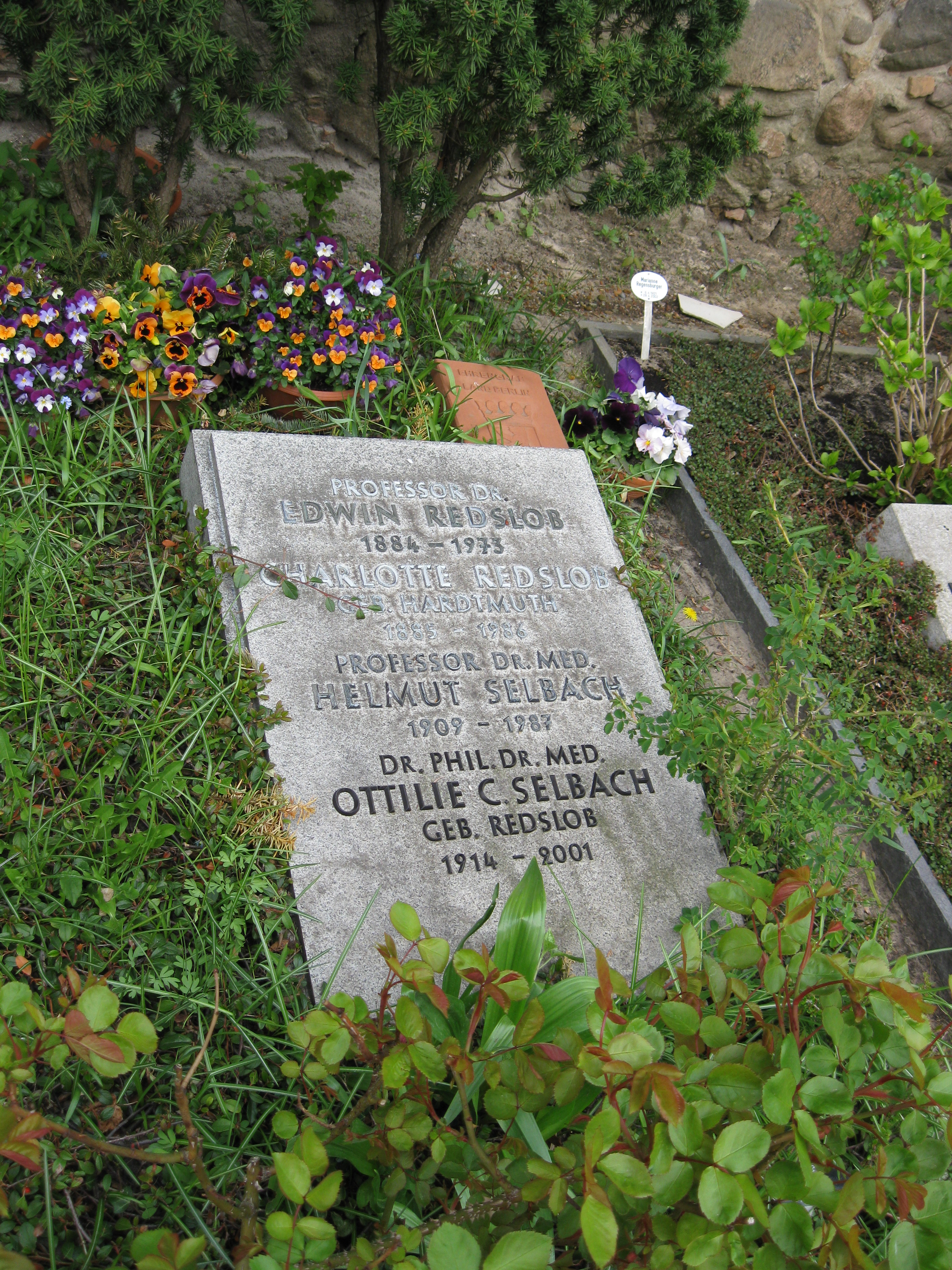
Grave of Redslob

In 1945, he co-founded the Berlin daily newspaper Der Tagesspiegel, and then in 1948, he was one of the co-initiators in the founding of the Freie Universität Berlin. He was a professor at the university teaching Art History from 1948 to 1954. He was also rector from 1949 to 1950.
