= Johannes Michael Speckter =

German lithographer and graphics collector (1764-1845)

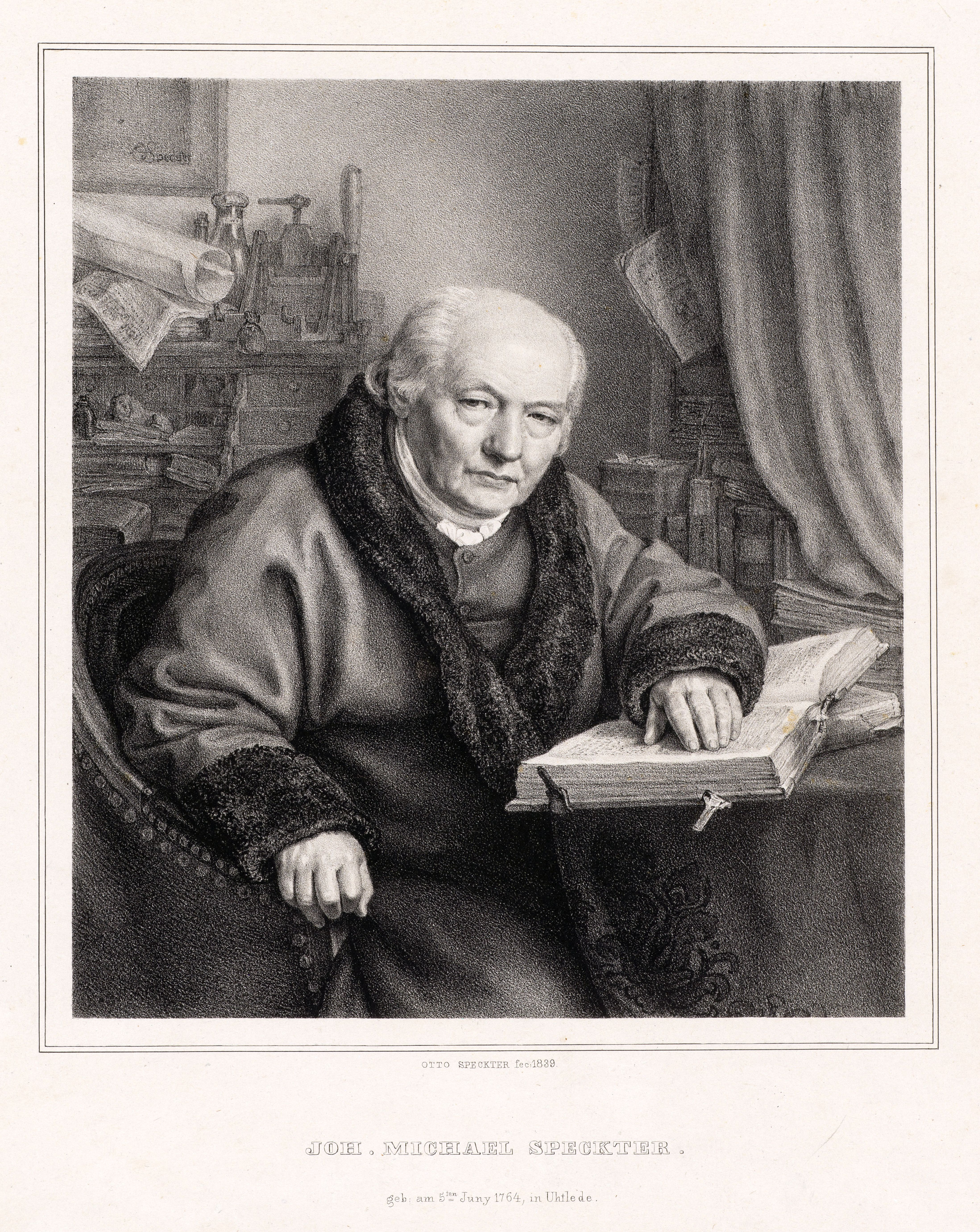
- Johannes Michael Speckter; portrait by Otto Speckter (1839)
- Born: 5 July 1764; Uthlede
- Died: 1 March 1845 (aged 80); Hamburg
- Occupations: German lithographer and graphics collector

Johannes Michael Speckter (5 July 1764, Uthlede - 1 March 1845, Hamburg) was a German lithographer and graphics collector.

== Life and work ==
His father was a teacher from Hanover. Around 1785, he moved to Hamburg. Under the influence of the architect, Ernst Georg Sonnin, he initially studied architecture, but then switched to studying mathematics at the Akademisches Gymnasium. In the 1790s, he turned to the business trades, but was also active as a collector and dealer of copper engravings and etchings.

In 1818, he created the first lithographic firm in Northern Germany. Together with Heinrich Joachim Herterich, who brought a team of specialists from Munich, he established "Hamb. Steindruckerei Speckter & Herterich" ("Speckter & Co" after 1829). The company proved to be very successful. Their regular clients included Friedrich Carl Gröger and Heinrich Jacob Aldenrath, who brought their portrait lithographs there to be printed.

In 1834, the company was taken over by his son, Otto Speckter. His other son, the painter Erwin Speckter, also briefly participated in the firm's operations.

His extensive collection of copper engravings later served as the basis for the Kupferstichkabinett at the Hamburger Kunsthalle.

== Sources ==
- Helmut Börsch-Supan (2010). "Speckter, Johann Michael". Neue Deutsche Biographie (in German). Vol. 24. Berlin: Duncker & Humblot. pp. 639–640. (full text online).
- Alfred Lichtwark: Das Bildnis in Hamburg, 2 Vols., Hamburg 1898, Kunstvereins zu Hamburg
- L. u. (1893). "Speckter" . Allgemeine Deutsche Biographie (in German). Vol. 35. Leipzig: Duncker & Humblot. pp. 85–88.
- Dirk Moldenhauer: "Speckter, Johann". In: Franklin Kopitzsch, Dirk Brietzke (Eds.): Hamburgische Biografie, Vol.1 Christians, Hamburg 2001, ISBN 3-7672-1364-8, pp.300–301
