= Ernst Böhm =

German painter

- Born: 6 March 1890; Berlin, Germany
- Died: 2 September 1963 (aged 73); Berlin, Germany
- Occupation: Painter

Ernst Böhm (6 March 1890 – 2 September 1963) was a German painter. His work was part of the art competitions at the 1928 Summer Olympics, the 1932 Summer Olympics, and the 1936 Summer Olympics.
