= Reichskunstwart =

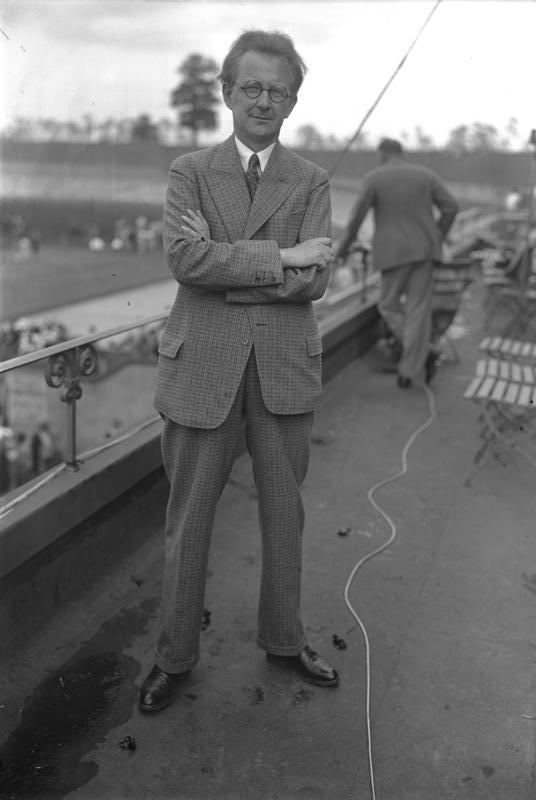
Edwin Redslob

The Reichskunstwart (German: Imperial Art Protector) was an official position within the Ministry of the Interior of the Weimar Republic, which was concerned with artistic matters and other regulatory issues. It mediated between regulators and artists. Its official address was Berlin NW 40, Platz der Republik 6. The role also covered monitoring the aesthetic quality of the new currency, lags, stamps and other such emblematic creations of the Weimar state.

When the post was announced, a number of people were suggested including Ernst Grisebach, Wilhelm Worringer, Wilhelm Valentiner. However on 29 December 1919, Edwin Redslob was appointed to the post. His investiture occurred on 1 July 1920. On 27 February 1933, the new Minister of the Interior, Wilhelm Frick, ordered the immediate dismissal of Redslob. The duties of the position were transferred to the Reich Ministry of Public Enlightenment and Propaganda.

== Bibliography ==
- Annegret Heffen: Der Reichskunstwart. Kunstpolitik in den Jahren 1920–1933. Zu den Bemühungen um eine offizielle Reichskunstpolitik in der Weimarer Republik, Verlag Die Blaue Eule, Essen 1986, ISBN 3-89206-137-8 (Historie in der Blauen Eule 3)
- Gisbert Laube: Der Reichskunstwart. Geschichte einer Kulturbehörde 1919–1933, Lang, Frankfurt am Main u. a. 1997, ISBN 3-631-31977-0 (Rechtshistorische Reihe 164), (Zugleich: Kiel, Univ., Diss., 1997)
- Christian Welzbacher: Der Reichskunstwart. Kulturpolitik und Staatsinszenierung in der Weimarer Republik 1918–1933, Weimarer Verlagsgesellschaft, Weimar 2010, ISBN 978-3-941830-04-2
