= Friedrich Paul Nerly =

Italian painter

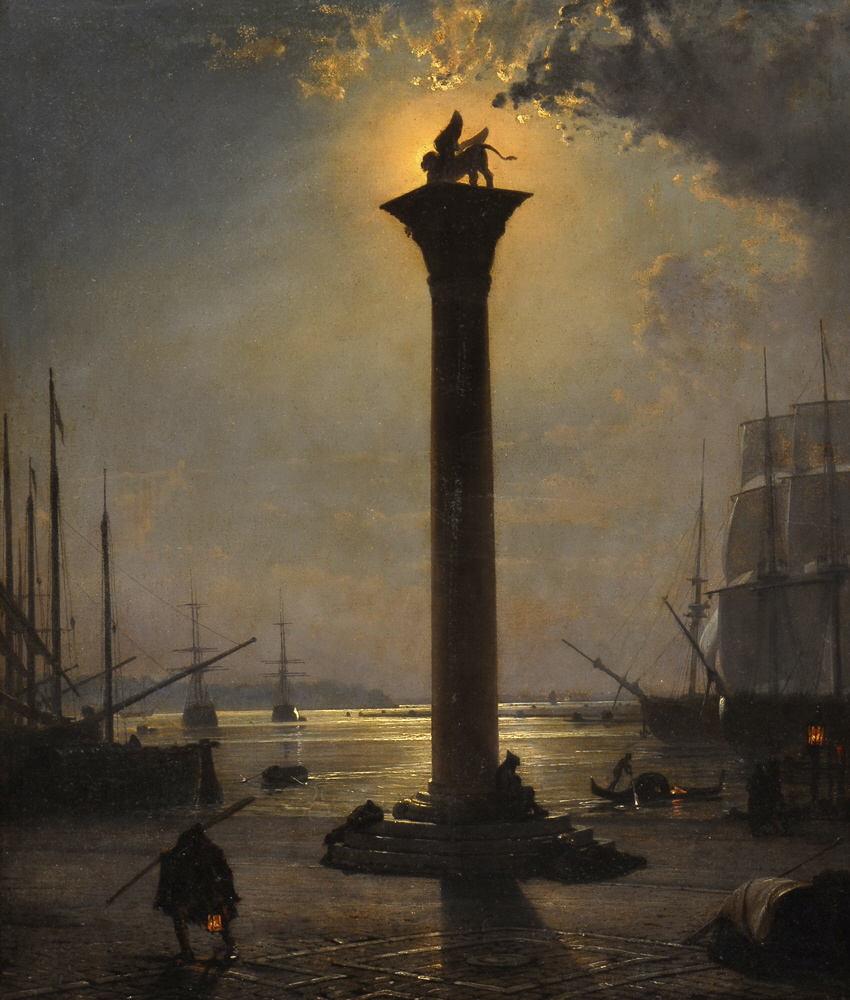
Piazetta San Marco in moonlight

Friedrich Paul Nerly or Federico Paolo Nerly (October 26, 1842 – May 19, 1919) was an Italian-German painter who specialized in seascapes.

== Biography ==
He was born in Venice. His father was the German landscape painter, Friedrich von Nerly, with whom he completed his first studies. He later enrolled in the Academy of Fine Arts of Venice, studying under professors Eugene de Blaas, Federico Moja, and Pompeo Mariano Molmenti. In 1862–1865 and in 1866, he served in the army. He visited the principal artistic cities of Germany: Düsseldorf, Weimar, Munich, and Dresden. In 1868, he traveled to Francia, Austria, Dalmatia, and Montenegro, and visited Rome, Naples, and Sicily.

He moved to Naples and Sicily to paint. His masterworks included Fishing in the Gulf of Siracusa, bought by the German emperor; I bragozzi dell' Adriatico, bought by the Civic Museum of Danzig; Palermo, veduta, bought by the Duchess of Genoa; Litorale veneto, bought by Revoltella Civic Museum at Trieste; The Lagoon of Venice, property of the Duke of Coburg; and Island of Capri, parte meridionale, which was sold to the Baroness of Friedlander in Berlin. Among his other works are Il salto di Tiberio veduto dal mure; Isola di Capri, exhibited at Rome in 1883; La spiaggia di Massa; Tempestuous Sea in the Gulf of Salerno, exhibited at Venice in 1887 and at Bologna in 1888; Burrasca; Marina di Napoli; and Sulla spiaggia. He died in Lucerne in 1919.
