= Otto Speckter =

German etcher and illustrator

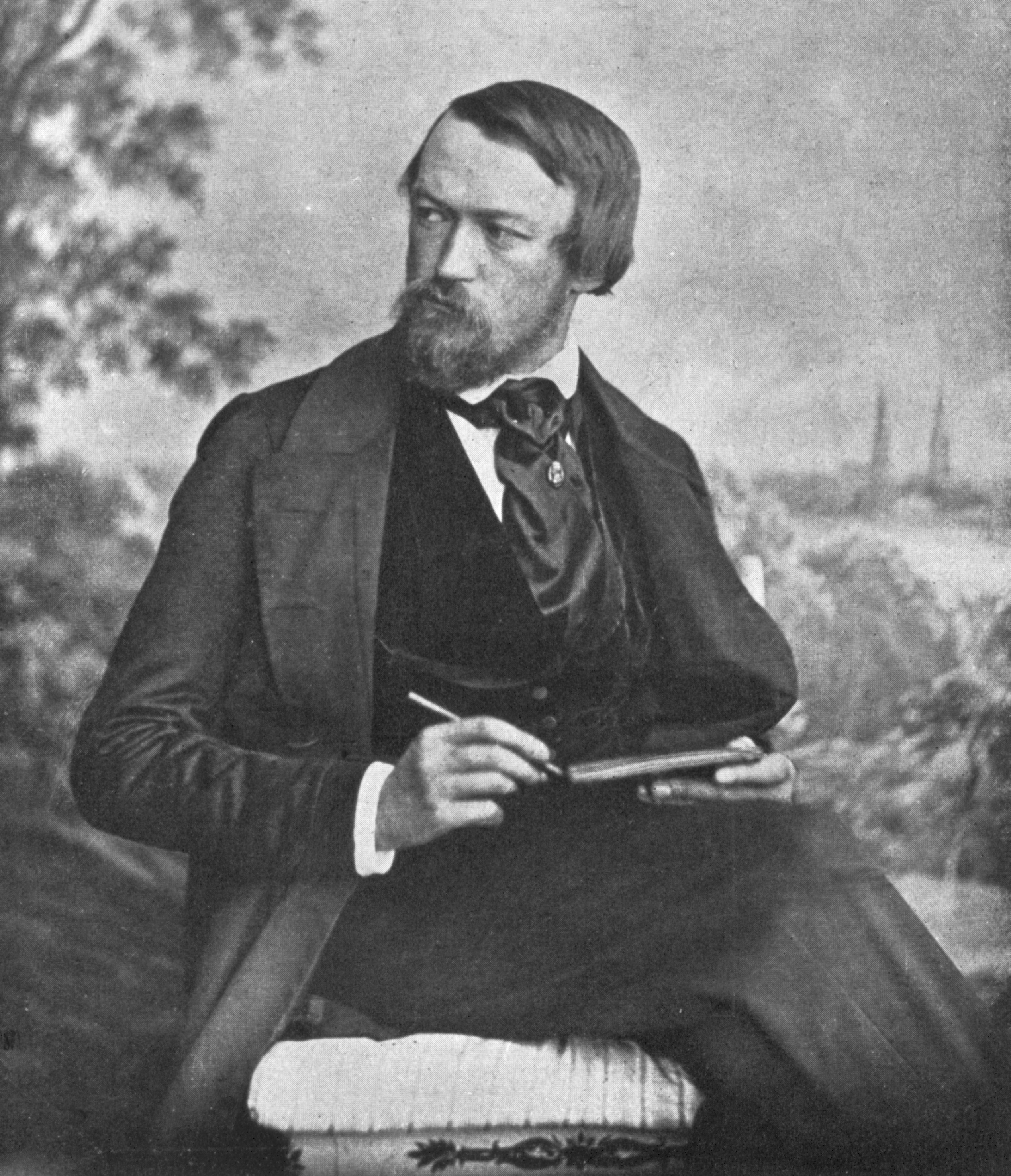
Otto Speckter; photograph by Carl Ferdinand Stelzner (c.1850)

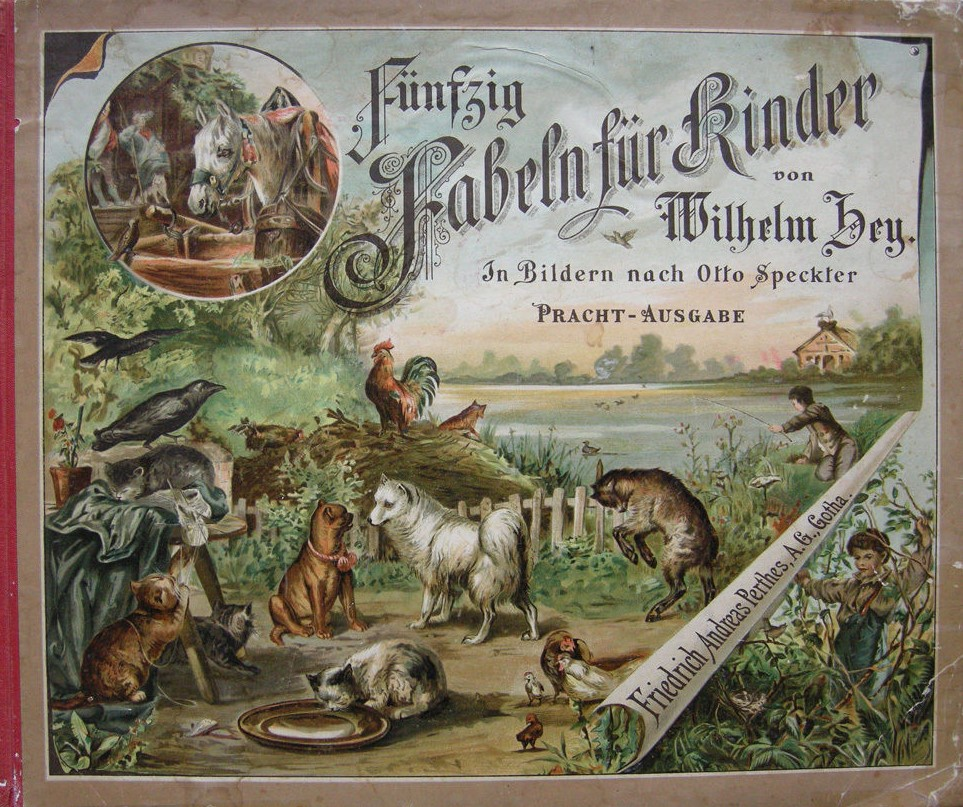
A deluxe edition of Fifty Fables for Children, published in 1888

Otto Speckter (9 November 1807, in Hamburg – 29 April 1871, in Hamburg) was a German etcher and illustrator.

== Life and work ==
He was the son of Johannes Michael Speckter, whose lithographic company he took over in 1834. His brother was the painter, Erwin Speckter. He initially made himself known through lithography, then began illustrating books with arabesques, vignettes and figure drawings.

He illustrated Luther's Small Catechism, Der Pilgerfahrt der Blumengeister (Pilgrimage of the Flower Spirits) by Adolf Böttger, Quickborn by Klaus Groth, Hannchen und die Küchlein (Hanna and the Cakes) by Christian August Gottlob Eberhard, Hanne Nüte by Fritz Reuter, and 50 Fabeln für Kinder (Fifty Fables for Children) by Wilhelm Hey, which was translated into English, by Mary Howitt. as Otto Speckter’s Fable Book.

He was one of the founding members of the Hamburger Künstlerverein von 1832. He was married to Marie Auguste, née Bergeest (1824–1899). Their son, Hans Speckter, also became an illustrator, but died in a mental institution at an early age. There is an "Otto-Speckter-Straße" in the Hamburg district of Barmbek-Nord. He was interred in a family plot at Ohlsdorf Cemetery.

In 2019, his works were part of an exhibition; "Hamburger Schule – Das 19. Jahrhundert neu entdeckt", held at the Hamburger Kunsthalle.

== Sources ==
- Veronika Braunfels: Otto Speckter (1807–1871). Illustrator und Lithograph in Hamburg, Verein für Hamburgische Geschichte, Hamburg 1995, ISBN 3-923356-63-3
- Walter Hettche (Ed.): Theodor Storm – Otto Speckter, Theodor Storm – Hans Speckter. Briefwechsel, Erich Schmidt, Berlin 1991, ISBN 3-503-03024-7
- L. u. (1893). "Speckter". Allgemeine Deutsche Biographie (in German). Vol. 35. Leipzig: Duncker & Humblot. pp. 85–88.
- Helmut Börsch-Supan (2010). "Speckter, Otto". Neue Deutsche Biographie (in German). Vol. 24. Berlin: Duncker & Humblot. pp. 640–641. (full text online).
- Hamburgisches Künstler-Lexikon Vol. 1, Hoffmann und Campe, Hamburg 1854, pg.243 (Online Hamburg Staats- und Universitätsbibliothek
