= Wischnitzer =

Wischnitzer or Wishnitzer (Hebrew: וישניצר) is a surname. Notable people with the surname include:

- Avner Wishnitzer (born 1976), Israeli historian, academic and peace activist
- Mark Wischnitzer (1882–1955), Russian-born scholar of Jewish history
- Rachel Wischnitzer (1885–1989), Russian-born architect and art historian, wife of Mark
- Yuval Wischnitzer (born 1947), Israeli athlete

== See also ==
- Max Wiznitzer, American pediatric neurologist
