= Cold Synagogue, Mogilev =

Destroyed wooden synagogue in Mogilev, Belarus

Cold Synagogue
- Yiddish: די קאַלטע שול
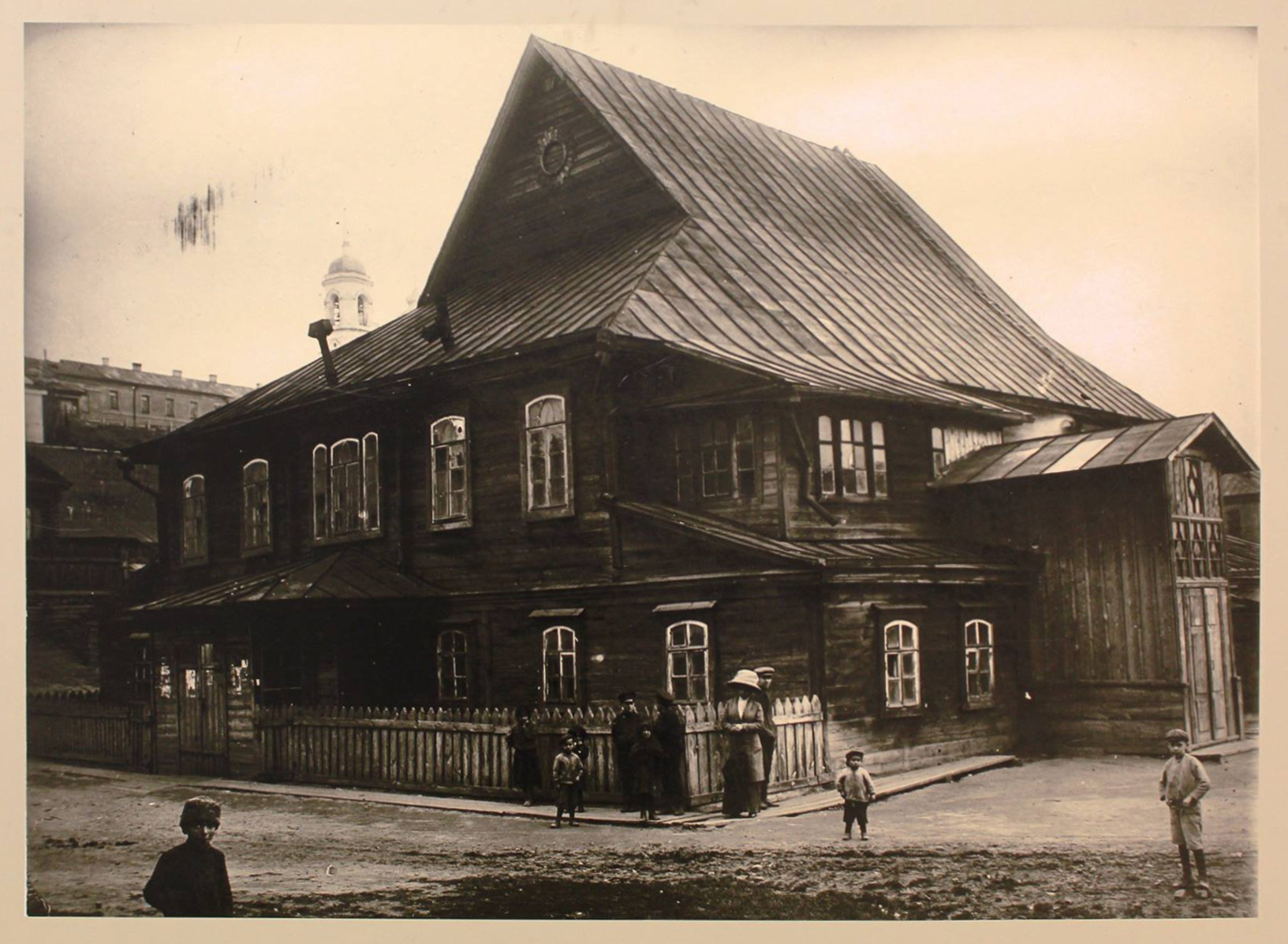
- The former synagogue, in 1913

- Location of the destroyed synagogue in Belarus

Religion
- Affiliation: Judaism (former)
- Ecclesiastical or organizational status: Synagogue (1680–1938)
- Status: Destroyed

Location
- Location: Mogilev, Mogilev Region
- Country: Belarus
- Interactive map of Cold Synagogue
- Coordinates: 53°53′34″N 30°19′56″E

Architecture
- Type: Synagogue architecture
- Style: Wooden
- Completed: 1680
- Destroyed: 1938
- Materials: Timber

The Cold Synagogue or Školišča Synagogue (Yiddish: די קאַלטע שול, Belarusian: Халодная сінагога на Школішчы) was a synagogue located near the intersection of Vyalikaja Hramadzianskaya (now Grażdanskaya) and Pravaya Naberezhnaya Streets, in Mogilev, Belarus.

The wooden synagogue was established in c. 1680, sited adjacent to a cheder. The interior was almost entirely covered with magnificent polychromes made in 1740s by the Słuck painter, Chaim ben Yitzchak ha-Levi Segal. In the beginning of the 20th century, several ethnographic expeditions, by Alexander Miller, S. An-sky and Solomon Yudovin, and by El Lissitzky and Issachar Ber Ryback documented and photographed interiors of the synagogue. After the article by Lissitzky, interior murals of the synagogue became quite famous in artistic circles. It was decided by the state authorities in 1918 that the synagogue was covered by legal protection. However, the synagogue was closed in 1938 and then dismantled by government authorities. The photos, drawings, and article by El Lissitzky is almost all evidence that preserved.

== History ==
The Cold Synagogue (named Cold because was unheated in winter), considered the most important in Mogilev, was built around 1680. It was located near the intersection of Vyalikaja Hramadzianskaya and Pravaya Naberezhnaya Streets, in the Jewish district of Školišča (literally "School district"), in a place marked today with a symbolic menorah (at the back of the preserved synagogue in Školišča, next to the blue gazebo erected on the occasion of the anniversary of the local water supply company).

In 1918, by one of the first decrees of the new Soviet government, the synagogue was recognized as a monument of the past and placed under state protection. Later it turned out to be the last stronghold of Jewish religious life in Mogilev and was closed in 1937. In 1938, it was dismantled into logs used for wells. Images of Segal's frescoes remained only in photographs and drawings by Ryback and Lissitzky. Lissitzky's original copies of the Mohilev synagogue decorations have been lost. They were reproduced in the journal that published his article and reprinted in many books on the cultural heritage of East European Jewry. They remain among Lissitzky's most frequently reproduced works.

Školišča district

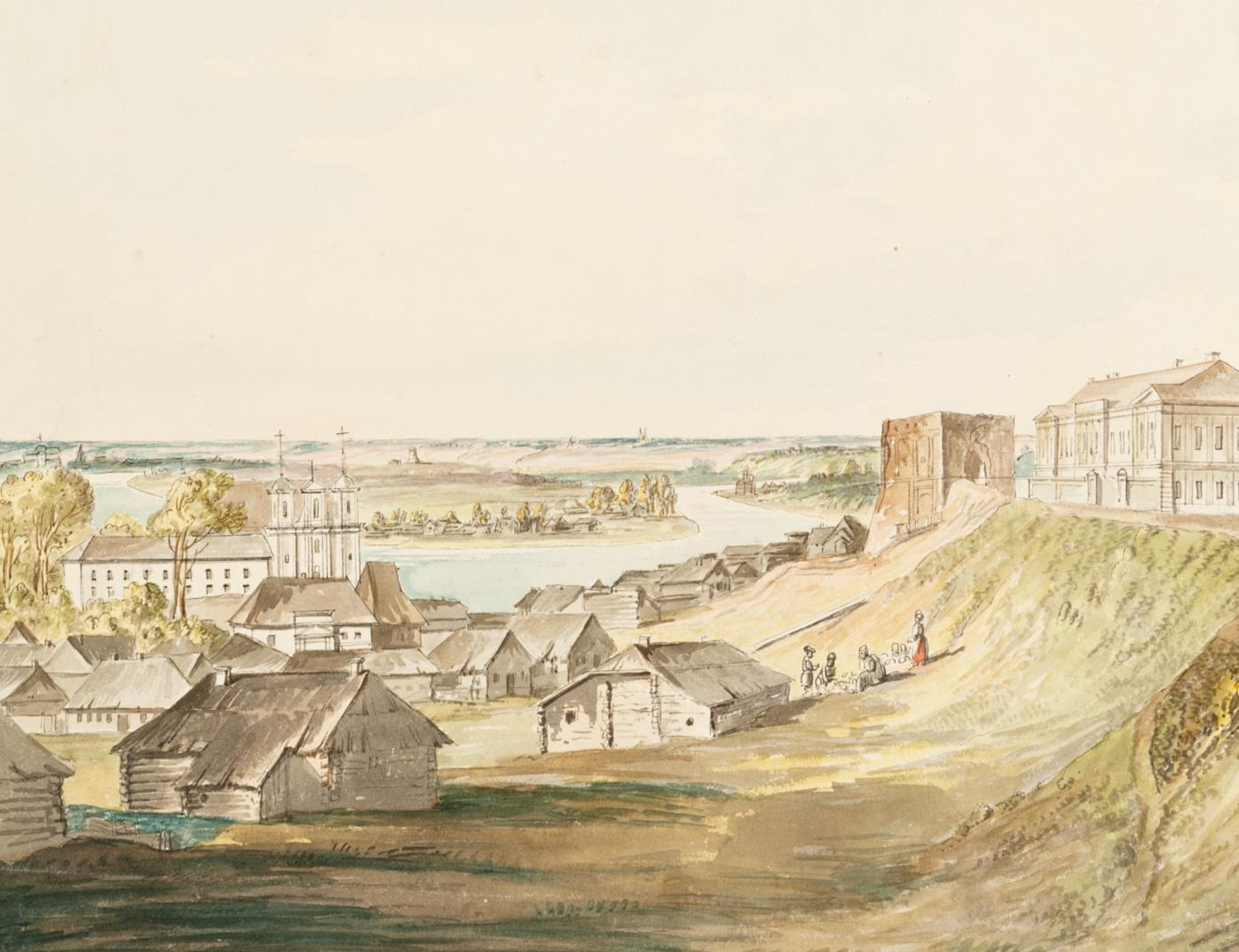
Painting by N.Lvov, 18th century. Synagogue is on the left, before the cathedral.

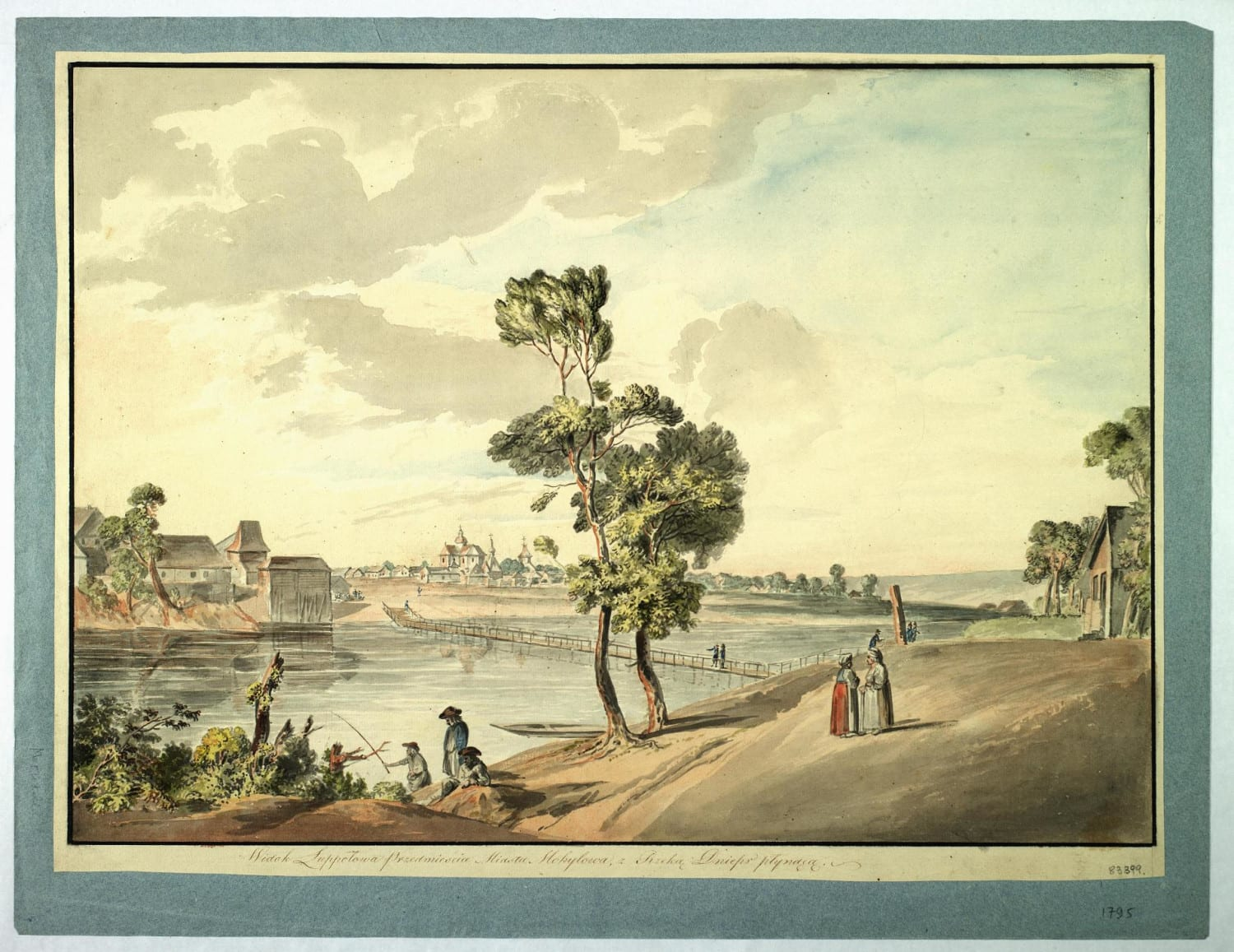
Painting by Józef Peszka, 1800. Synagogue is on the left, under the Dnieper river.

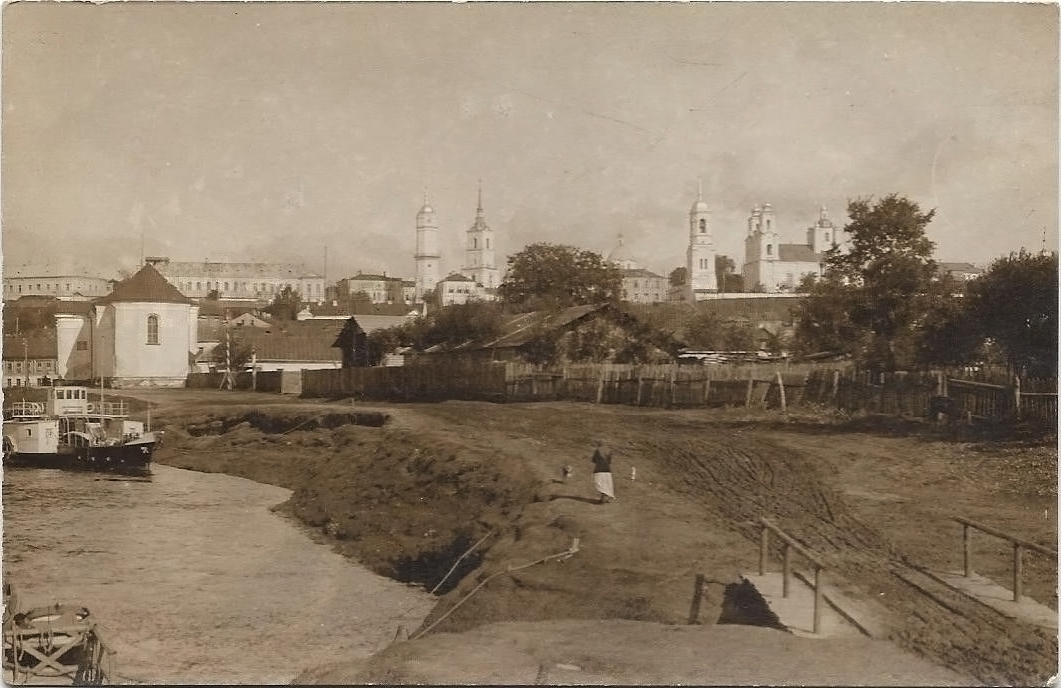
Školišča, photo from 1918.

== Architecture ==
The synagogue building was a wooden structure built on a stone foundation. It was a typical example of wooden synagogues in the Polish–Lithuanian Commonwealth, very few of which preserved (most were destroyed in wars, pogroms, or by Soviet authorities). The walls of the Cold Synagogue were cut from edged logs into a clean corner. The central log house was dominant in height, to which side log houses were adjoined as covered galleries. A pentagonal structure was added to the main facade, which covered the main entrance. The building was covered with a high gable roof, with a complex plan and numerous outbuildings. In the end of 19th - beginning of 20th century the roof was covered with tin.

The most detailed memoirs of the synagogue are in the article by El Lissitzky:

The walls—wooden, oaken beams that resound when you hit them. Above the walls, a ceiling like a vault made out of boards. The seams all visible. Although the work of the carpenter is without artfulness, without imagination, the whole interior of the shul is so perfectly conceived by the painter with only a few uncomplicated colors that an entire grand world lives there and blooms and overflows this small space. The complete interior of the shul is decorated, starting with the backs of the benches, which cover the length of the walls, all the way to the very pinnacle of the vault. The shul, which is a square at the level of the floor, becomes an octagonal vaulted ceiling, resembling a yarmulke. Triangular panels mask the transition from square to octagon. These walls and ceiling are structured with an immense feel for composition. This is something completely contrary to the primitive. This is the fruit of a great culture. Where does it come from? The master of this work, Segal, says in his inscription, full of the most noble enthusiasm: “Long already have I wandered through the world of the living...”

— El Lissitzky

Exterior of the synagogue

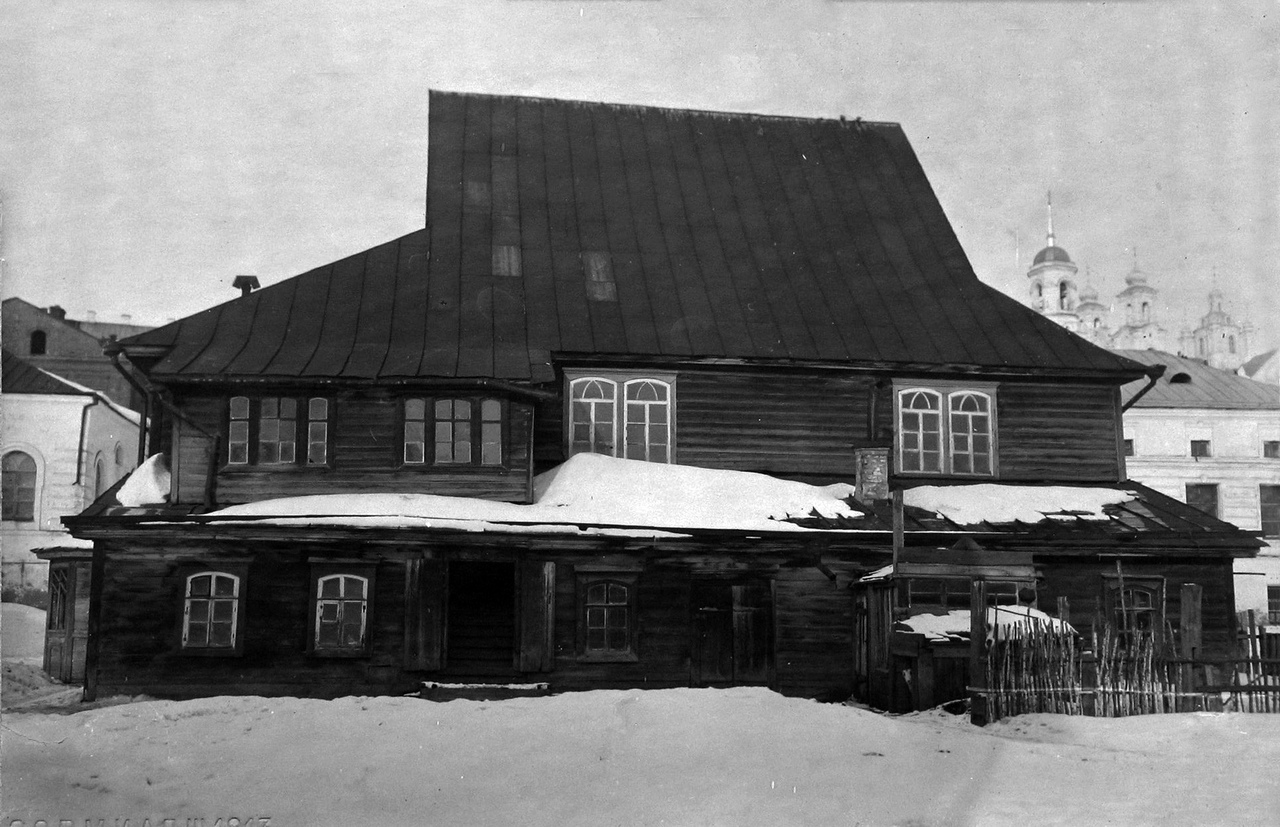
Photo by Alexander Alexandrovich Miller, 1908

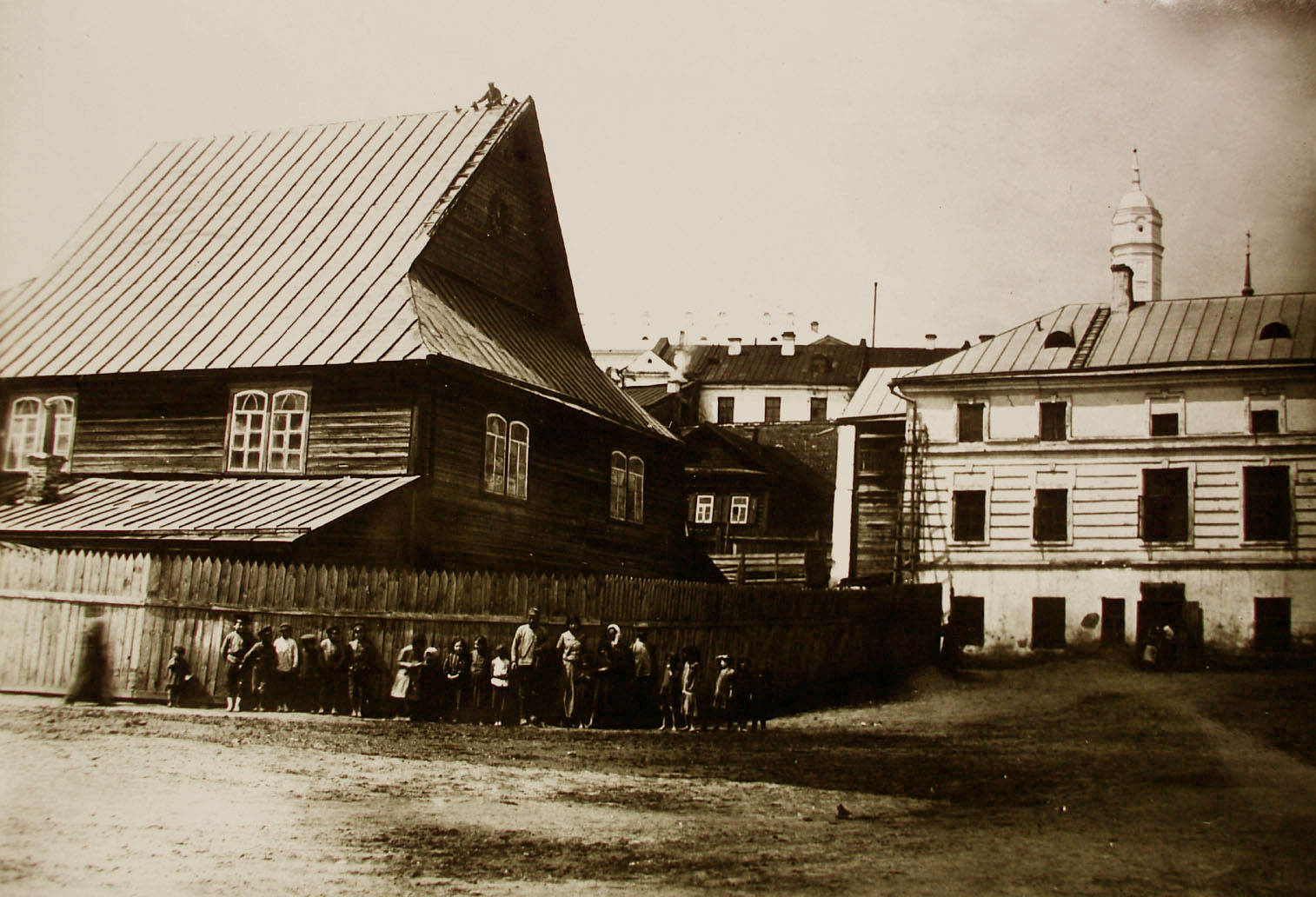
Photo by Solomon Yudovin, 1913

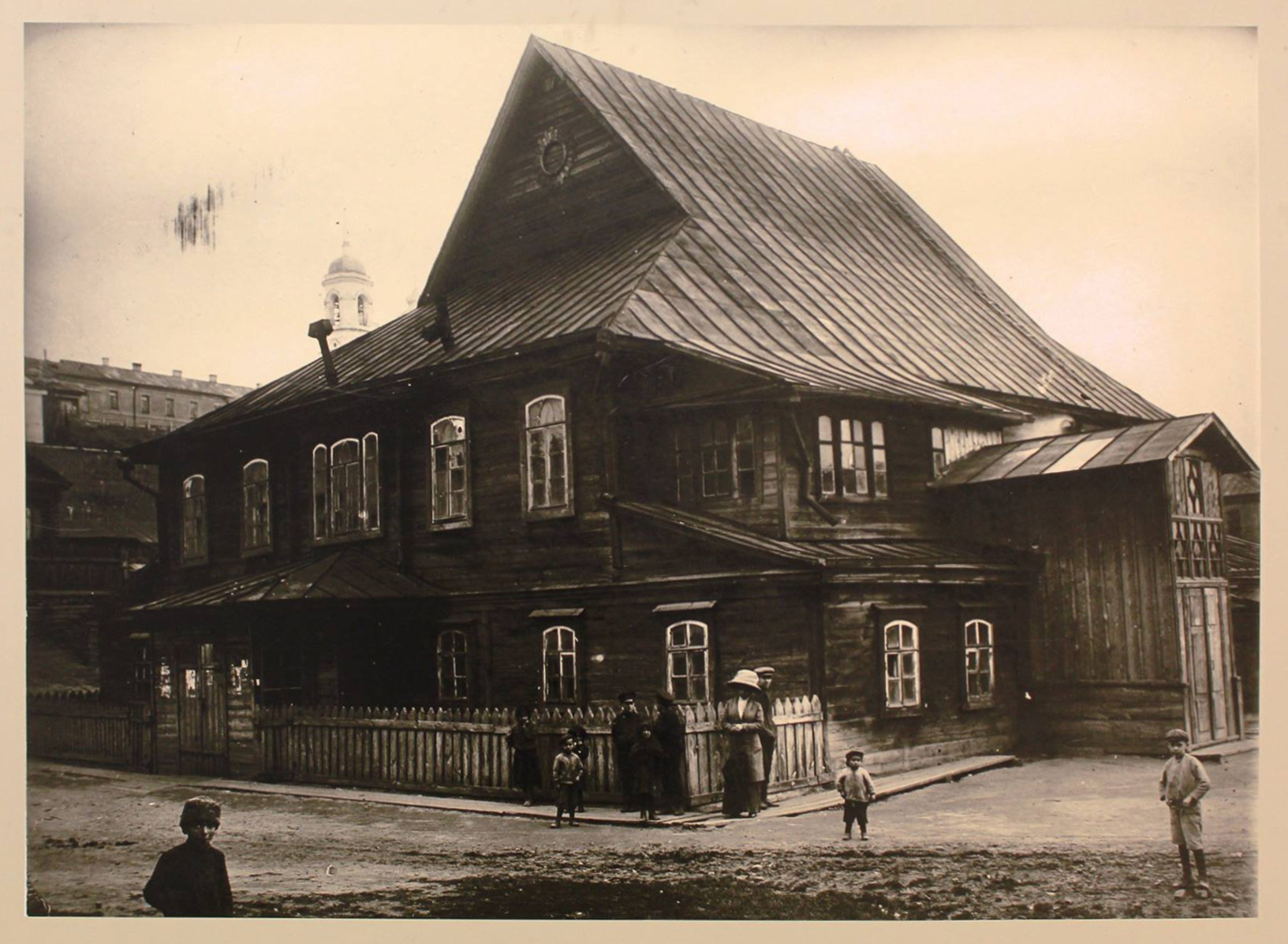
Photo by Solomon Yudovin, 1913

== Ethnographic expeditions ==
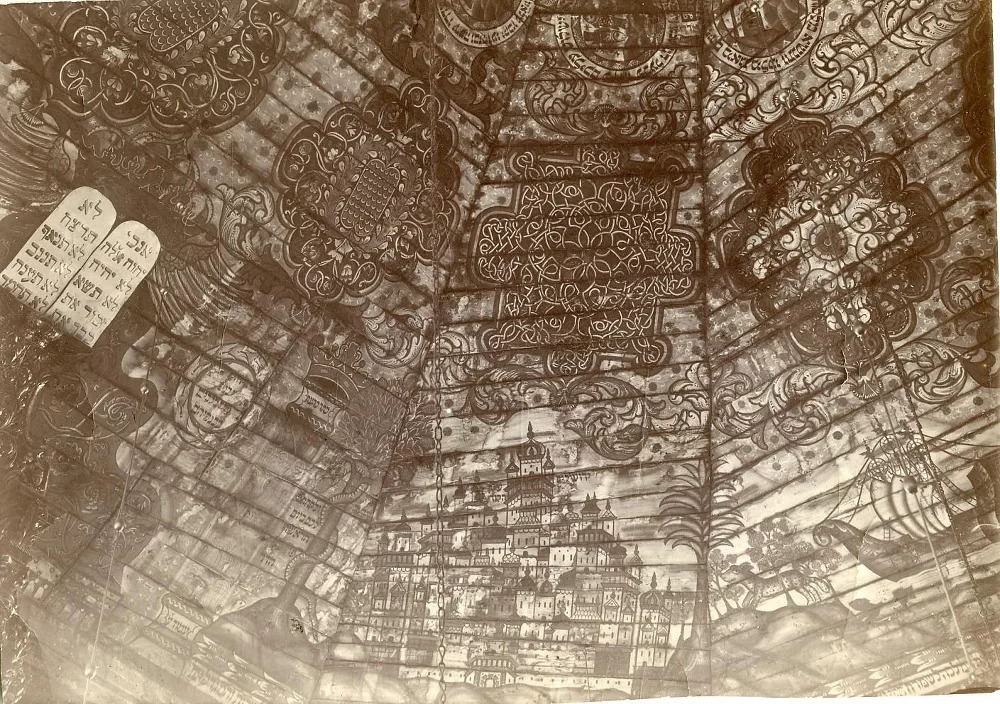
Murals, photo by Miller, 1908 Jerusalem, caravelle, arabesques, the Garden of Eden serpent, and the Tablets of the Law can be seen here.

First known ethnographic expedition that visited Mogilev was by archaeologist and ethnographer Alexander Alexandrovich Miller in 1908. In 1913, S. An-sky, founder of Jewish Historical Ethnographic Society, together with artist and photographer Solomon Yudovin, also visited Cold Synagogue. Some photos made by Miller and Yudovin are now in the Russian Museum of Ethnography in Saint Petersburg.

According to published data, attention was drawn to the synagogue and its murals after the 1916 expedition by El Lissitzky and Issachar Ber Ryback, famous representatives of avant-garde art movement, and an article by an influential art critic Rachel Wischnitzer, published in the Volume XI of "History of the Jewish People", "History of the Jewish People in Russia", in 1914 along with several photographs of the paintings. Some researchers argue that this expedition was also sponsored and commissioned by S. An-sky's Jewish Historical Ethnographic Society, while others said that there are no evidence of that.

== Interior murals ==
=== Chaim Segal ===
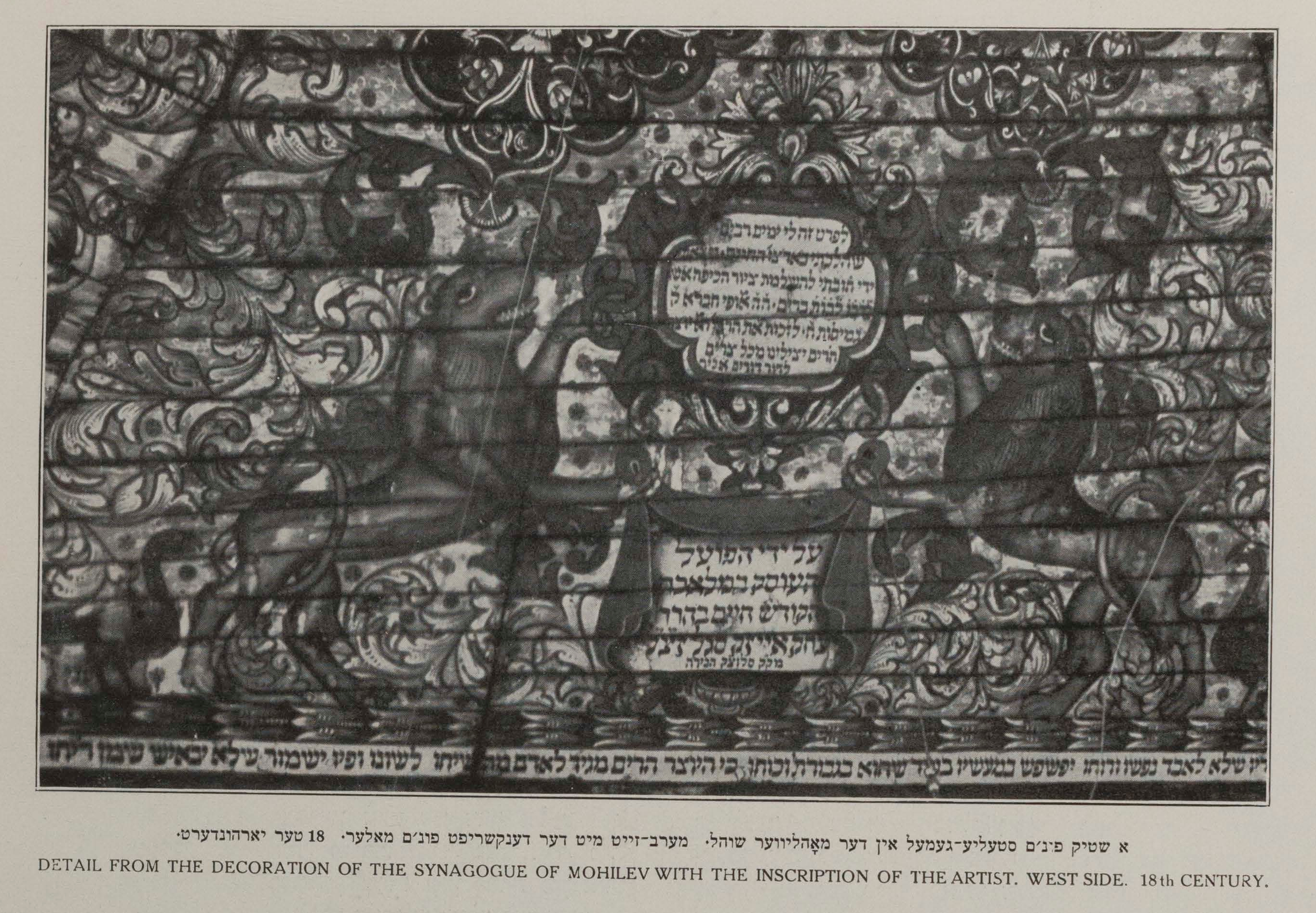
Inscriptions made by Chaim Segal

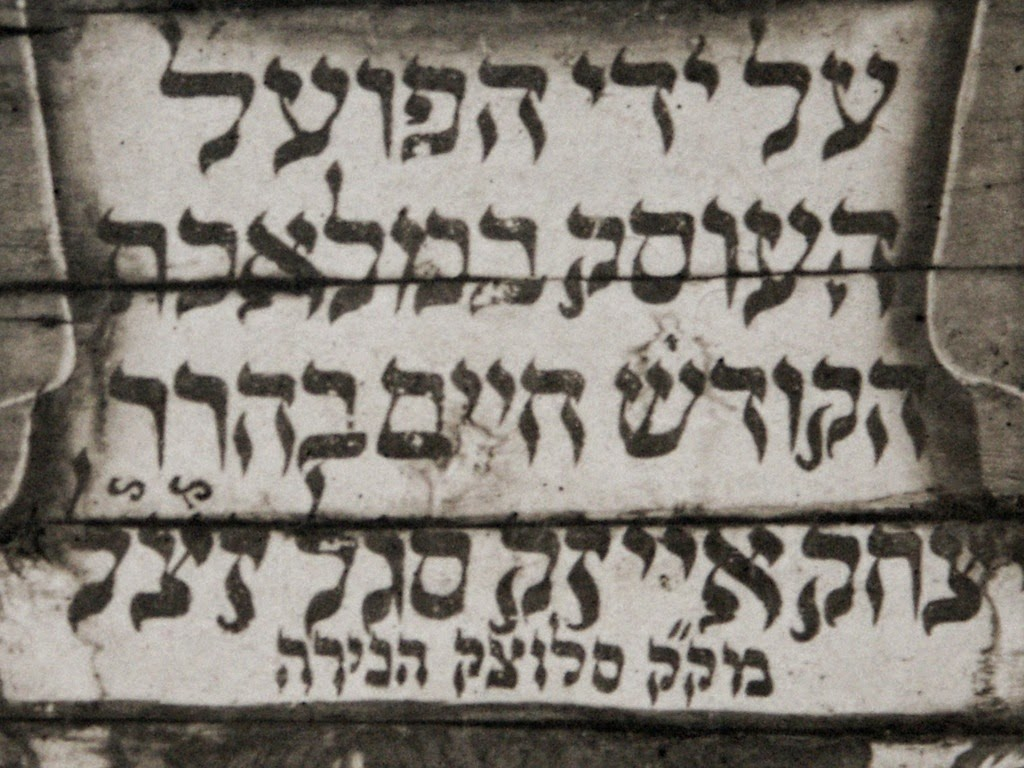
Second inscription made by Chaim Segal

The interior was almost entirely covered with magnificent polychromes made in 1740 by the Slutzk painter Chaim ben Yitzchak ha-Levi Segal. (Note: His name can also be written as Khaim Segal or Hayyim Segal.) It is unusual that the name of the mural painter is known, the only reason to that is the inscriptions that Chaim Segal made on the walls of the synagogue.

First inscription, on a cartouche at the springing or base of the dome on the entrance side said:

I have traveled many days in the lands of the living.
I have felt in my duty to execute this decoration donated by pious hearts.

The text continues on a shield below:

By the master skilled in the holy work, Hayyim, son of Yitzhak Eisik Segal, from the Holy Community of Slutzk.

The first inscription contains a chronogram of the Hebrew year, that corresponds to 1740.

== Description ==
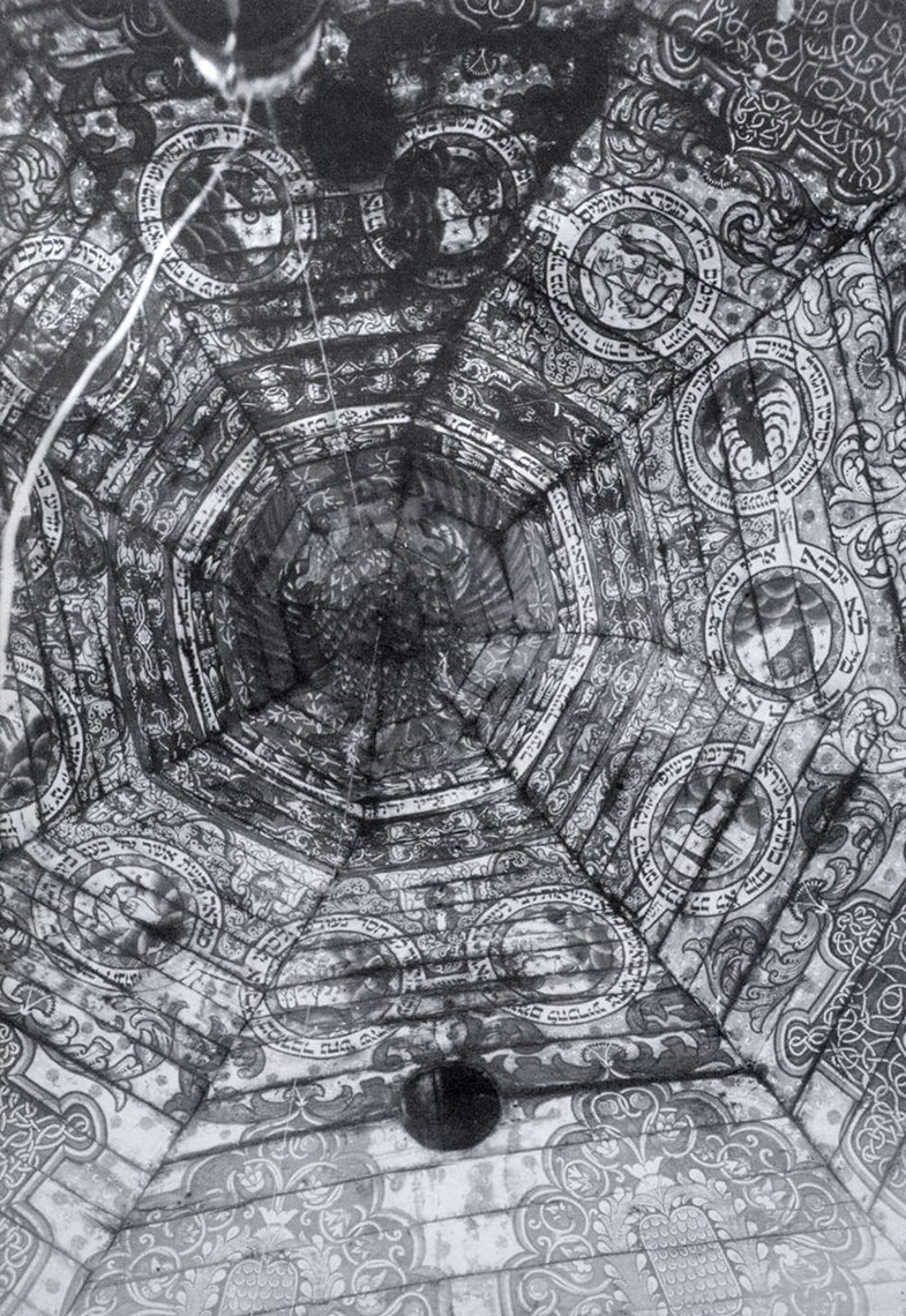
12 signs of the zodiac.

Segal's murals, made on boards, represented the images of 12 signs of the zodiac, arabesques, mythical animals and cities. Wischnitzer and Lissitzky wrote about the decorations at length.

With many modes varied, these ornamental motifs became widespread in the 17th and 18th centuries. We meet them in abundance on the walls and vaults of synagogues. They dress with a continuous pattern the domes of synagogues in Kopys, in Mogilev on the Dnieper and in Michalpol, on Podil. In these unpretentious looking wooden huts, you can admire arabesques, which are rare for such a late time of purity of the drawing, cartouches framing prayer inscriptions of a noble, calm form and impressive grotesque lions on the background of deciduous stains. This painting is akin to the ornament that was engraved on metal shields during the Renaissance: the same foliage pattern, the same rope gossip, beasts, fantastic gradations in medallions.

— Rachel Wischnitzer (Note: Ha множество ладовъ варіируемые, эти орнаментальные мотивы получили въ XVII и въ XVIII веках широкое распространеніе. Мы встрѣчаемъ ихъ въ изобиліи на стѣнахъ и сводахъ синагогъ. Они одѣваютъ сплошнымъ узоромъ куполы синагогъ въ Копысѣ, въ Могилевѣ на Днѣпрѣ и въ Михалполѣ, на Подольѣ. Въ этихъ незатѣйливыхъ съ виду деревянныхъ избахъ можно любоваться арабесками рѣдкой для столь поздняго времени чистоты рисунка, картушами, обрамляющими молитвенныя надписи, благородной, спокойной формы и внушительными гротесками-львами на фонѣ лиственныхъ разводовъ. Живопись эта сродни орнаменту, который въ эпоху ренессанса гравировали на металлическихъ щитахъ: тотъ же лиственный узоръ, тѣ же какъ бы веревочныя сплетенія, звѣри, фантастическіе грады въ медальонахъ.)

The twelve signs of the zodiac, usually placed in the medallions, at the top of the dome, are interpreted, for example, in the meaning of the tribes of Israel; heraldic eagles, lions, panthers and deer, typical representatives of the fauna of Asia Minor, whose images are borrowed from middle-aged illustrated manuscripts, from Persian carpets, from engravings of the Renaissance era, are used to visually explain the sacred texts. In this role, they appear on the walls of the synagogue in Yablonov, illustrating the dictum from the Mishna: Be brave like a panther, light like an eagle, fast like a deer, and brave like a lion, while doing the will of your Father in heaven. Lion is also used as the emblem of the tribe of Judas; on the breast of the eagle, finally, the Polish heraldic one-headed eagle, afterwards replaced by the two-headed Austrian, are placed in the middle of the shield in the blessing hands of the Aaronids.

— Rachel Wischnitzer (Note: Двѣнадцать знаковъ зодіака, помѣщаемые обыкновенно въ медальонахъ, на верхушкѣ купола, истолковываются, напр., въ смыслѣ колѣнъ Израилевыхъ; геральдическіе орлы, львы, пантеры и олени, типичные представители фауны Малой Азіи, изображенія которыхъ заимствованы изъ средневѣковыхъ иллюстрированныхъ рукописей, съ персидскихъ ковровъ, съ гравюръ эпохи ренессанса, привлекаются для нагляднаго поясненія священныхъ текстовъ. Въ этой роли они фигурируютъ на стѣнахъ синагоги въ Яблоновѣ, иллюстрируя изреченіе изъ Мишны: Будь отваженъ какъ пантера, легокъ, какъ орелъ, быстръ, какъ олень, и храбръ, какъ левъ, при исполненіи воли Отца твоего небеснаго. Левъ употребляется и въ качествѣ эмблемы колѣна іудина; на груди орла, наконецъ, польскаго геральдическаго одноглаваго орла, впослѣдствіи замѣненнаго двуглавымъ австрійскимъ, помѣщаются по серединѣ щита благословляющія руки ааронидовъ.)

=== Chaim Segal and Marc Chagall ===
Marc Chagall claimed that Chaim Segal was his great-grandfather, and compared his own art to Segal's synagogue murals:

Jews, if they feel like it (I do), may cry that the painters of the shtetl wooden synagogues (why am I not with you in one grave) and the whittlers of the wooden synagogue rattles — "Hush!" (I saw it in An-sky's collection, got seared) are gone. But what is really the difference between my crippled Mohilev great-grandfather Segal who painted the Mohilev synagogue and me, who painted the Yiddish theater (a good theater) in Moscow? Believe me, no fewer lice visited both of us as we wallowed on the floor and in workshops. in synagogues and in theater. Furthermore, I am sure that, if I stop shaving, you would see his precise portrait...

By the way, my father [looked like him]. Believe me, I put quite a bit of effort, no less love (and what love!) have we both expended.

The difference is only that he [Segal] took orders for signs and I studied in Paris, about which he also heard something.

— Marc Chagall, Leaves from My Notebook

Most modern researches doubt it, and there is no evidence that Chagall had ever seen any murals that Segal created. It's also possible that elter-zeyde ("great-grandfather" in Yiddish) simply means "forefather" or "ancestor" with no hereditary commitment.

=== El Lissitzky and Issachar Ber Ryback's expedition ===
Detail from the synagogue decoration with a ship, and its further usage.

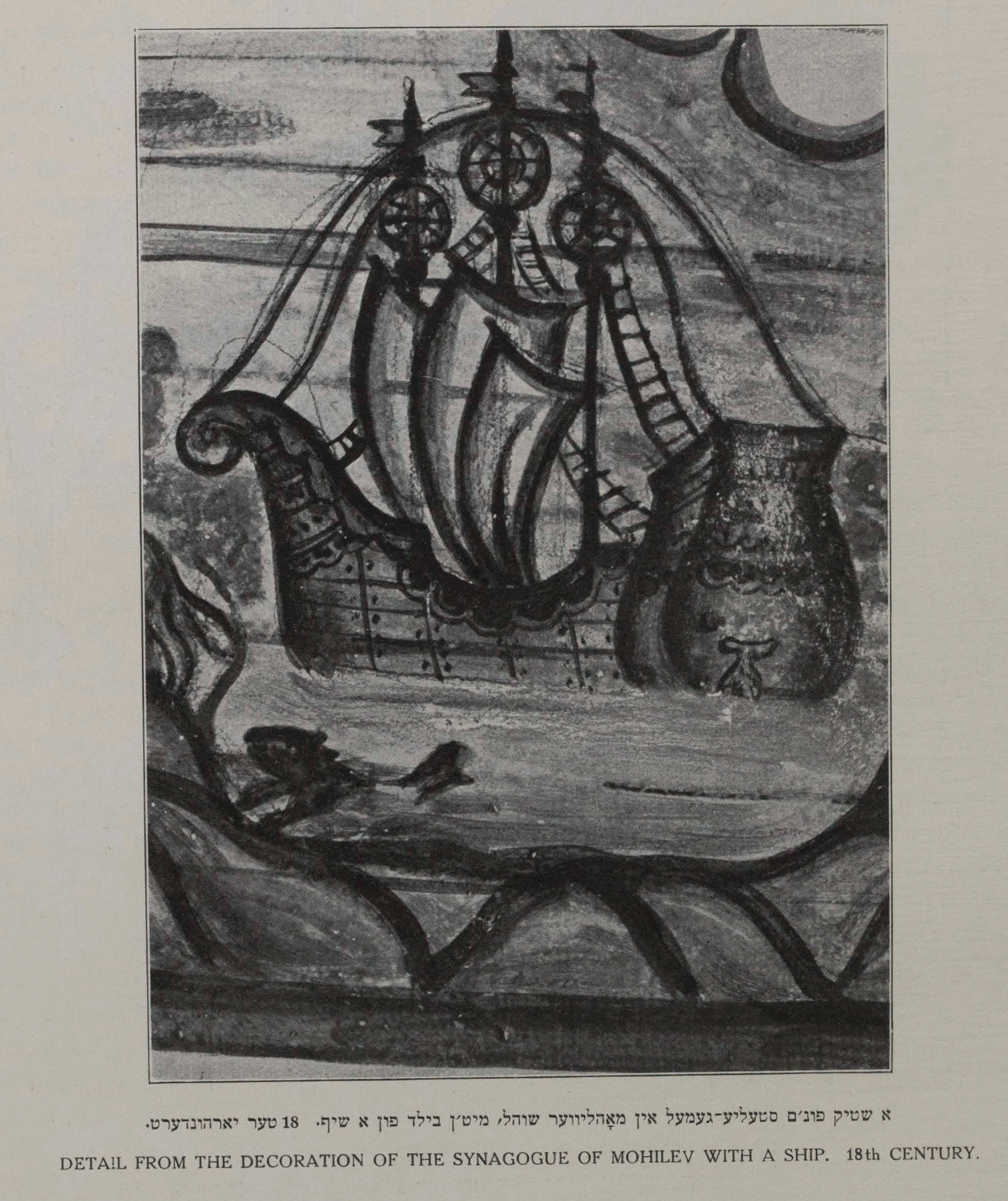
Copy by El Lissitzky, 1916.

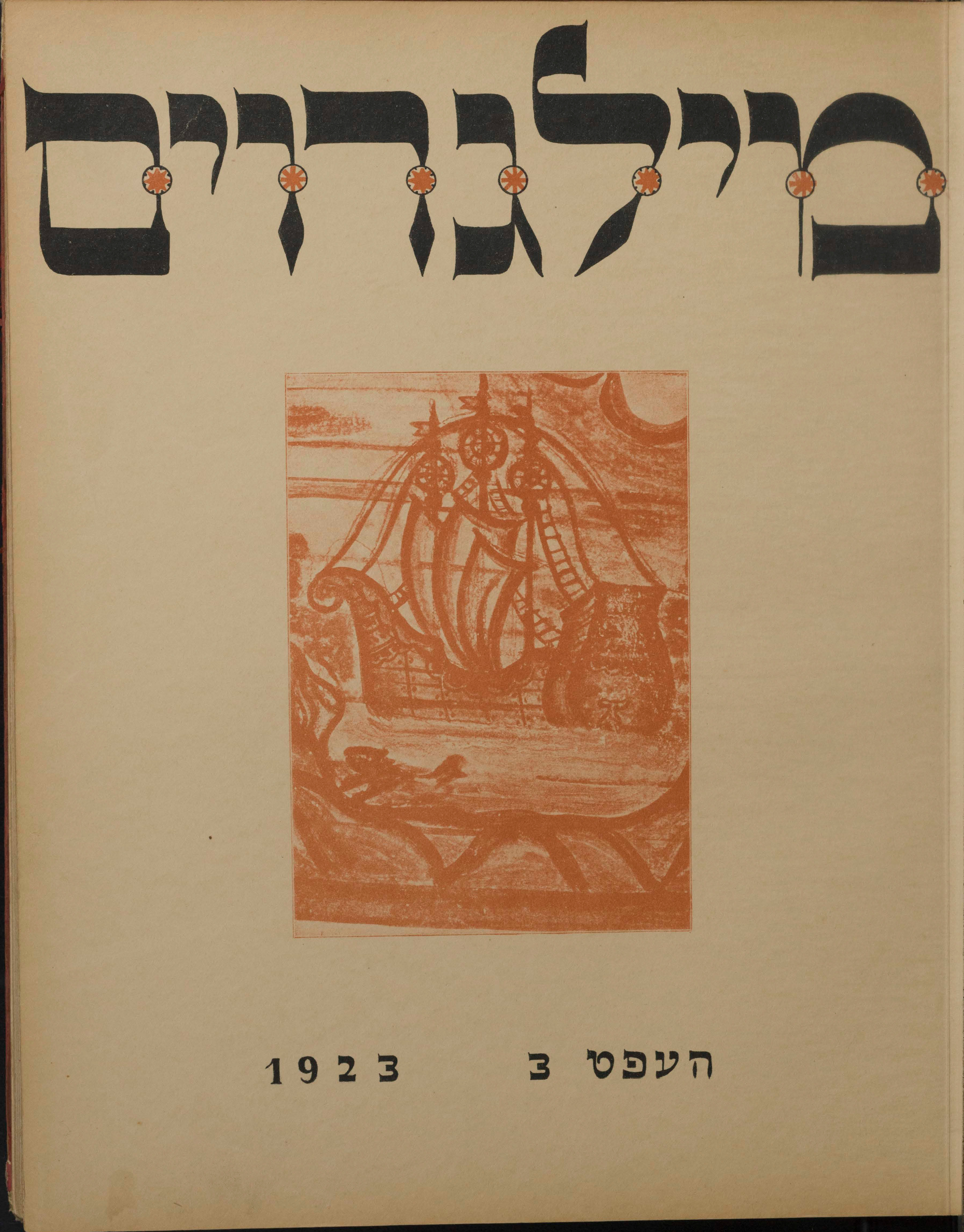
Title page of the third issue of Rimon–Milgroim, 1923.

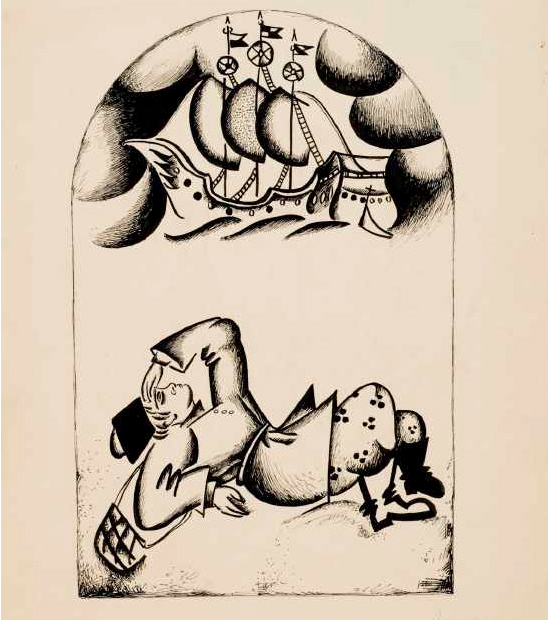
Page from Ukraynishe Folkmayses (Ukrainian Folktales) by El Lissitzky, 1919-1922.

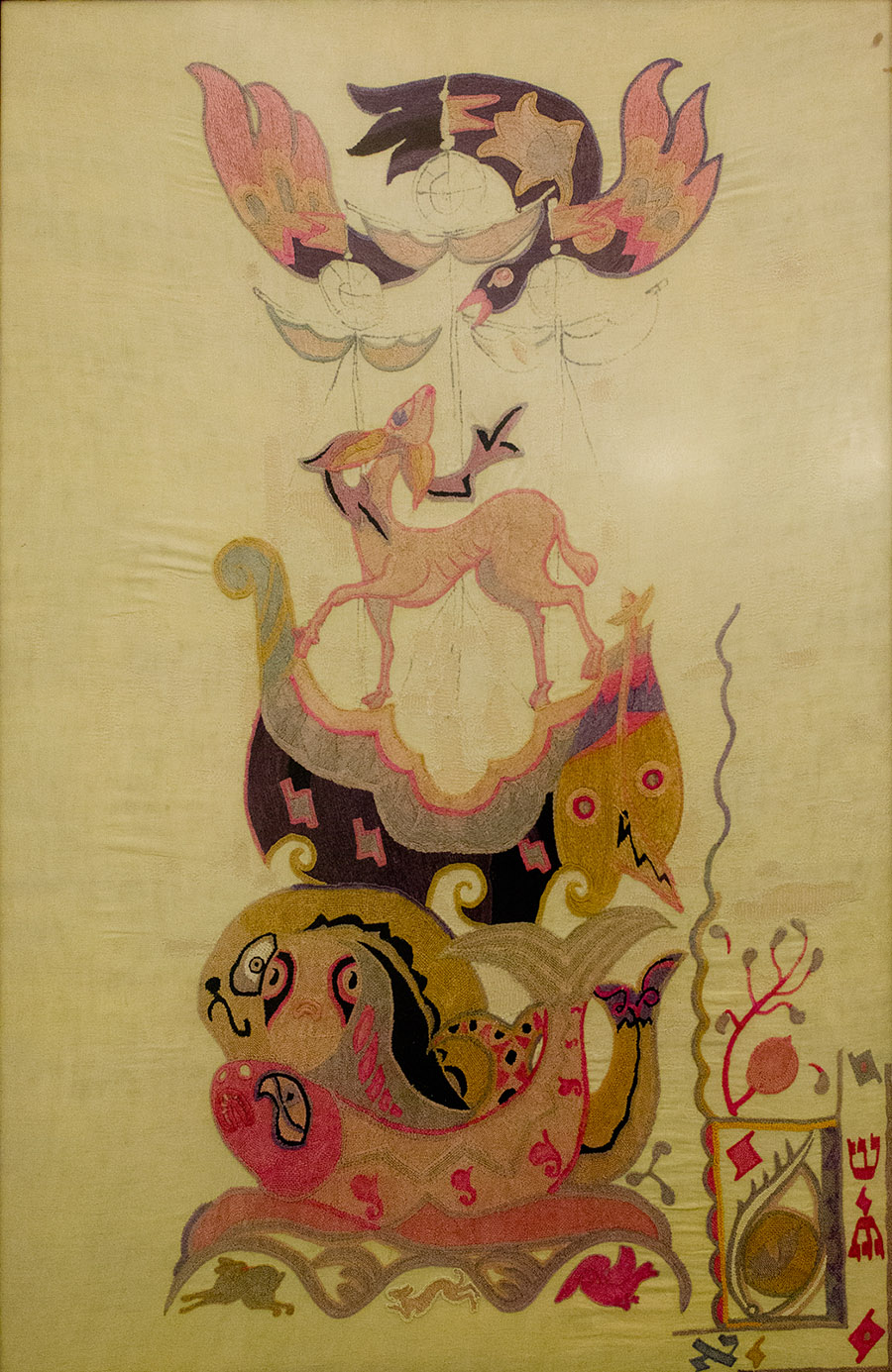
Embroidery by Polia Chentoff, based on Lissitzky's drawings, 1919.

The description and copies of the paintings were left in an article dedicated to Jewish art, "On the Mogilev Shul: Recollections", by El Lissitzky, who visited Mogilev with his colleague-artist Issachar Ber Ryback. They toured a number of cities and towns of the Belarusian Dnieper region and Lithuania in order to identify and fix on photo the monuments of Jewish antiquity. Lissitzky's article on the Cold Synagogue was published in 1923 in Berlin by the Jewish magazine Rimon–Milgroim.

In the work of Rachel Wischnitzer, the painting of the Mogilev synagogue is compared with the paintings of the synagogues in Yablonovo and Kopys. Moreover, the Yablonov painting is assessed by the author higher than the painting by Chaim Segal, at least "in terms of the selection of ornamental material." Lissitzky wrote enthusiastically and emotionally describing elements of wall painting. Here is his first impression of what he saw: "No, this was something different from that first surprise I received when I visited the Roman basilicas, the Gothic cathedrals, the Baroque churches of Germany, France, and Italy. Maybe, when a child awakens in a crib that is covered with a veil upon which flies and butterflies are sitting and the entire thing is drenched by the sun, maybe the child sees something like that."

Lissitzky's assessment of the skill of Chaim Segal is also very different in comparison with that given by Rachel Wischnitzer: "The treasury of forms used by the painter is inexhaustible. One sees how it all flowed from him, as from a cornucopia, and how the hand of the virtuoso never grew tired and never allowed itself to be outpaced by the speed of thought. On the back of the holy ark I discovered the first sketches in pencil of the outline of the entire painting, which served as the foundation of the later work in paint. This outline was sketched on the wall by a master with intense confidence, for whom the pencil is perfectly under the control of his will."

Further, about Chaim Segal, El Lissitzky mentions a common legend told about the old masters who created a kind of miracle: "People say that he painted three shuls. In Mogilev, Kopust, and in Dolhinov (others recall a different location for the latter). After he had finished, he fell from the scaffolding and died. Each shtetl tells the story about itself: the Mogilevers say he died in Mogilev, the Kapusters—in Kopust, the Dolhinevers—there. The last two shuls burned down. The Dolhinov burned long ago; my father used to say that he remembered a giant fresco in it of the burial of Jacob with a wagon, horses, the sons of Jacob, Egyptians, etc. Today we cannot compare. But the story is characteristic for our understanding of the artist. His work was so great that his continued life could only diminish him. Once his work was completed his soul had no more reason to be in his body."

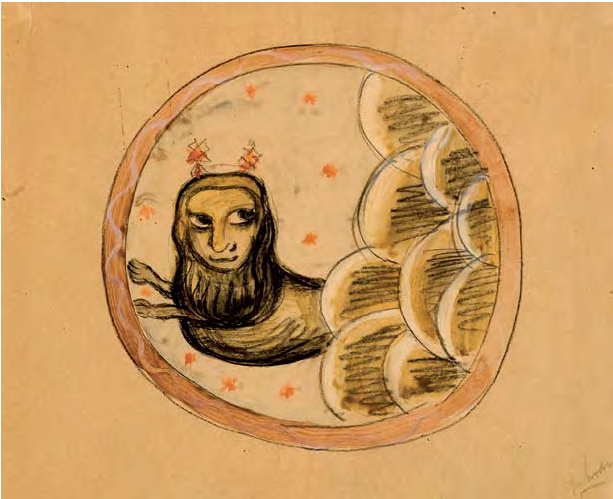
Lion. Copy of a Zodiac painting on the ceiling (by El Lissitzky). "Is that not a rabbinical face in the lion’s head in the zodiac paintings of the Mogilev Shul?"

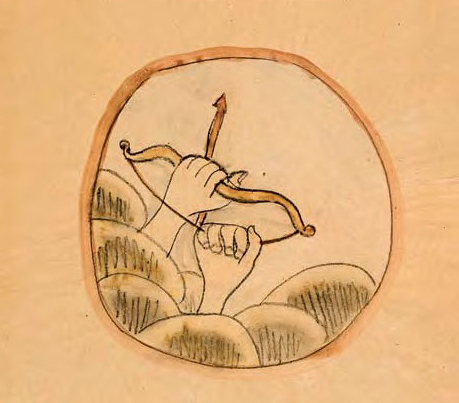
Sagittarius. Copy of a Zodiac painting on the ceiling (by El Lissitzky). "...the Archer (mazl kashes). In its entirety it consists of two hands; one holds the bow, the other pulls on the string. This is the "powerful hand", the "punishing hand" of the bible."

The centerpiece of the whole place is the ceiling. On the western side, by the entrance, there stand giant lions and, behind them, peacocks. The lions hold two shields with inscriptions, the lower one is a memorial by the master for himself. Then there are three northern and three southern panels like a kind of frieze upon which unfurls the lives of predators and prey. Below there is water, upon it the earth, above the earth a sky; in the sky, stars that blossom into flowers. In the water—fish; they are being caught by the birds. On the earth a fox carries a bird in its snout. A bear climbs a tree looking for honey. Birds carry snakes in their beaks. All these flying things and running things—are people. Through their four-footed or feathered masks they look with human eyes. This is a very significant trend in Jewish folk art. Is that not a rabbinical face in the lion's head in the zodiac paintings of the Mogilev Shul?

— El Lissitzky

From the frieze blossoms forth a giant plant-ornamentation, which encircles the entire ceiling in a ring. Above this a row of seals of a more oriental, I would even say Moorish composition, and in them a complicated interweaving of ropes, a motif that strongly recalls Leonardo da Vinci's drawing of the seal of his academy. And now I remember that in the castle in Milan I saw a hall, whose ceiling was also ascribed to Leonardo, also with a similar rope ornamentation.

The zodiacs stand in a row above the rope ornament. Twelve compositions within circles, linked together in one complete whole. The zodiac paintings are very distinctive and some of their signs are especially concise and powerful. For example, the Archer (mazl kashes). In its entirety it consists of two hands; one holds the bow, the other pulls on the string. This is the "powerful hand", the "punishing hand" of the bible. And above all of this, in the centerpoint of the "yarmulke"—a three-headed eagle: a combination of the Russian and the Polish eagles. In the east, above the holy ark, more lions, only these are holding the tablets of the Ten Commandments and from them a large mercy seat covers the ark. On the sides are two panels—to the left on the southern wall a "vormayse", depicting the cursed city of Worms encircled by some kind of dragon, and a tree of life. On the other side, in the northwest—Jerusalem and the tree of knowledge. On the triangles that mask the transition from the walls to the ceiling, on one of them, in the northwest, the shorabor, the ox that will be eaten in paradise; on the other side, in the northeast, a wild goat; on the third, in the southeast, the leviathan and on the fourth, in the southwest, an elephant with a palanquin on its back.

On the walls—panels with inscriptions, holy vessels from King Solomon's Temple, ornaments, and all kinds of living creatures.

— El Lissitzky

Lissitzky finished his article about the synagogue with a statement: "That which is called art is created when one does not know that what one is doing is art. Only then does it remain as a memorial to culture. Today art is created through those who fight against it."

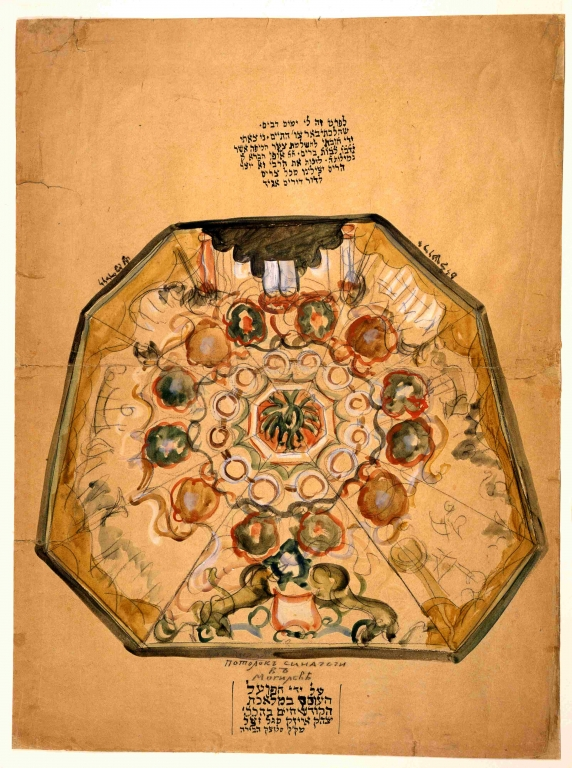
Ceiling of Mogilev synagogue by Issachar Ber Ryback

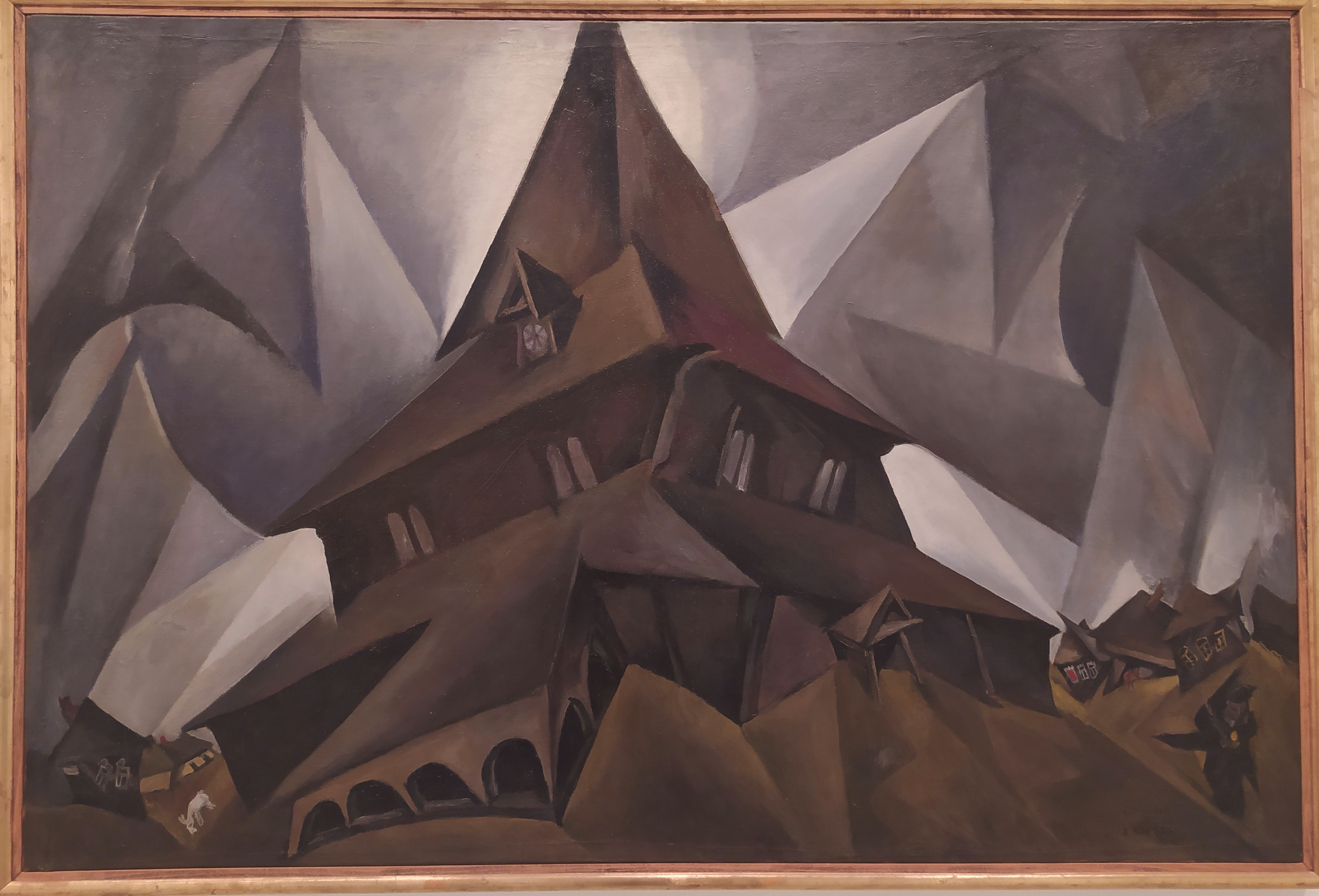
The Synagogue in Dubrouna by Ryback (1917). The synagogue in painting resembles the Cold synagogue and similar wooden ones, and Ryback probably was inspired for this work during the shtetl tour few years earlier. (Note: This painting was published in the first issue of Rimon-Milgroim.)

The description of the synagogue made by El Lissitzky is well illustrated by the sketch drawing of Issachar Ber Ryback. Art historian Ruth Apter-Gabriel, curator of the Israel Museum in Jerusalem, calls this drawing "the first and only one of its kind, giving an idea of the plot of the ceiling of the famous the Mogilev synagogue ... and living evidence of the search for modernist Jewish art in Russia during the revolution." The researcher notes that, despite the sketchy drawing of Ryback, it is an invaluable visual addition to the text of Lissitzky. Many details from Lissitzky's description can be easily identified, such as the Ark, lions, signs of the Zodiac or the Tree of Life. Ryback's drawing is not only easily compared with Lissitzky's description, but also fills in unknown parts of the plot.

"Of course, one can regret the sketchiness of the drawing," writes Ruth Apter-Gabriel, and one of her explanations is the artist's desire to convey the idea of the plot of the ceiling painting as a whole. Another version, she believes, is the possibility that the drawing is actually not a sketch of a ceiling painting, but a preparatory composition for future work.

"Jewish period" was very short in the art of Lissitzky, though many of his works were inspired by Jewish folk art; on the contrary, for Issachar Ber Ryback everyday life of a Jewish shtetl became the foundation of his art.

Lissitzky and Ryback also visited the synagogue of Kopys, located 50 km north of Mogilev, with very similar decoration by the hand of the same master - Chaim Segal.

=== Juspa the Schammes of Worms ===
Murals inspired by Juspa's tales

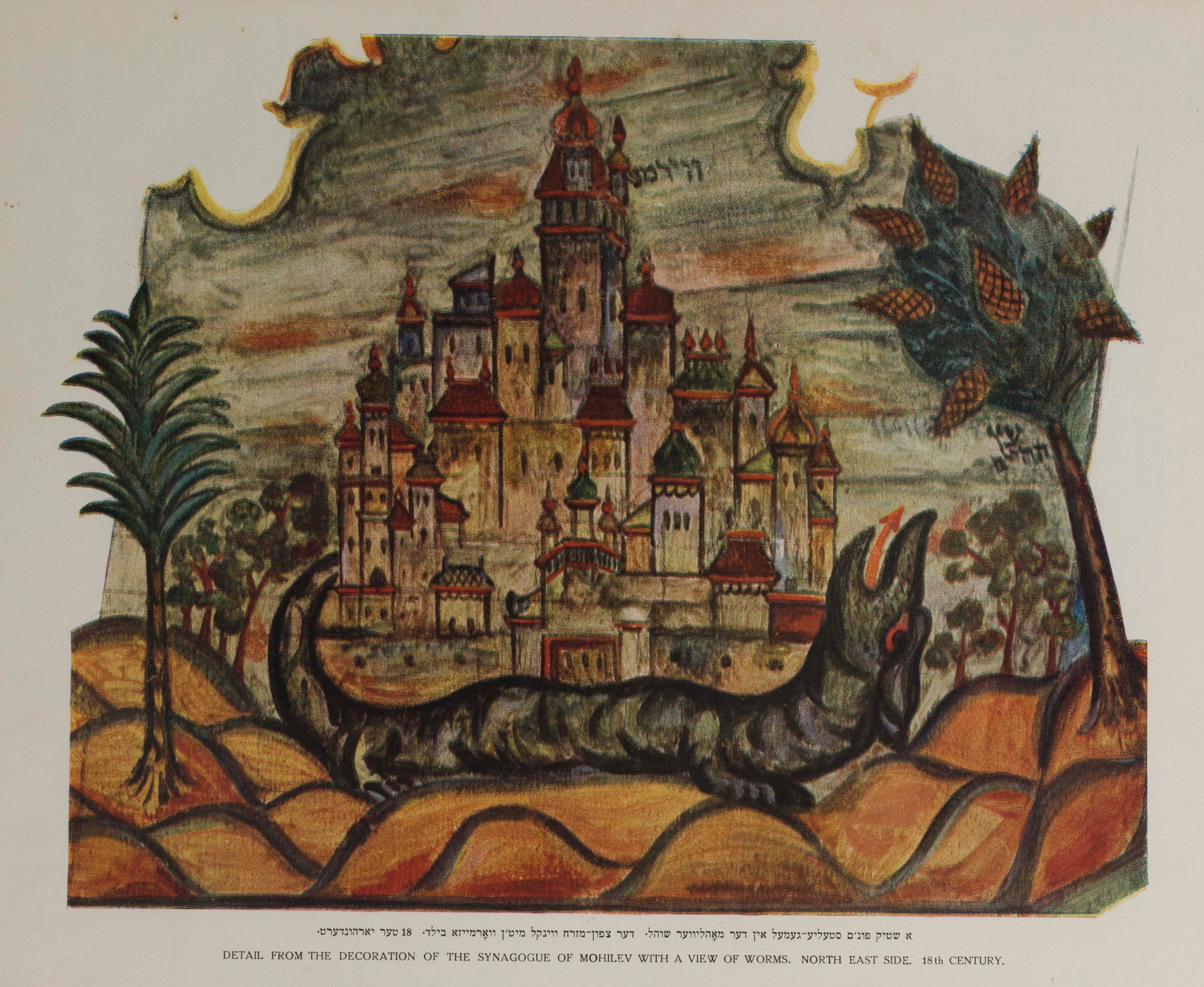

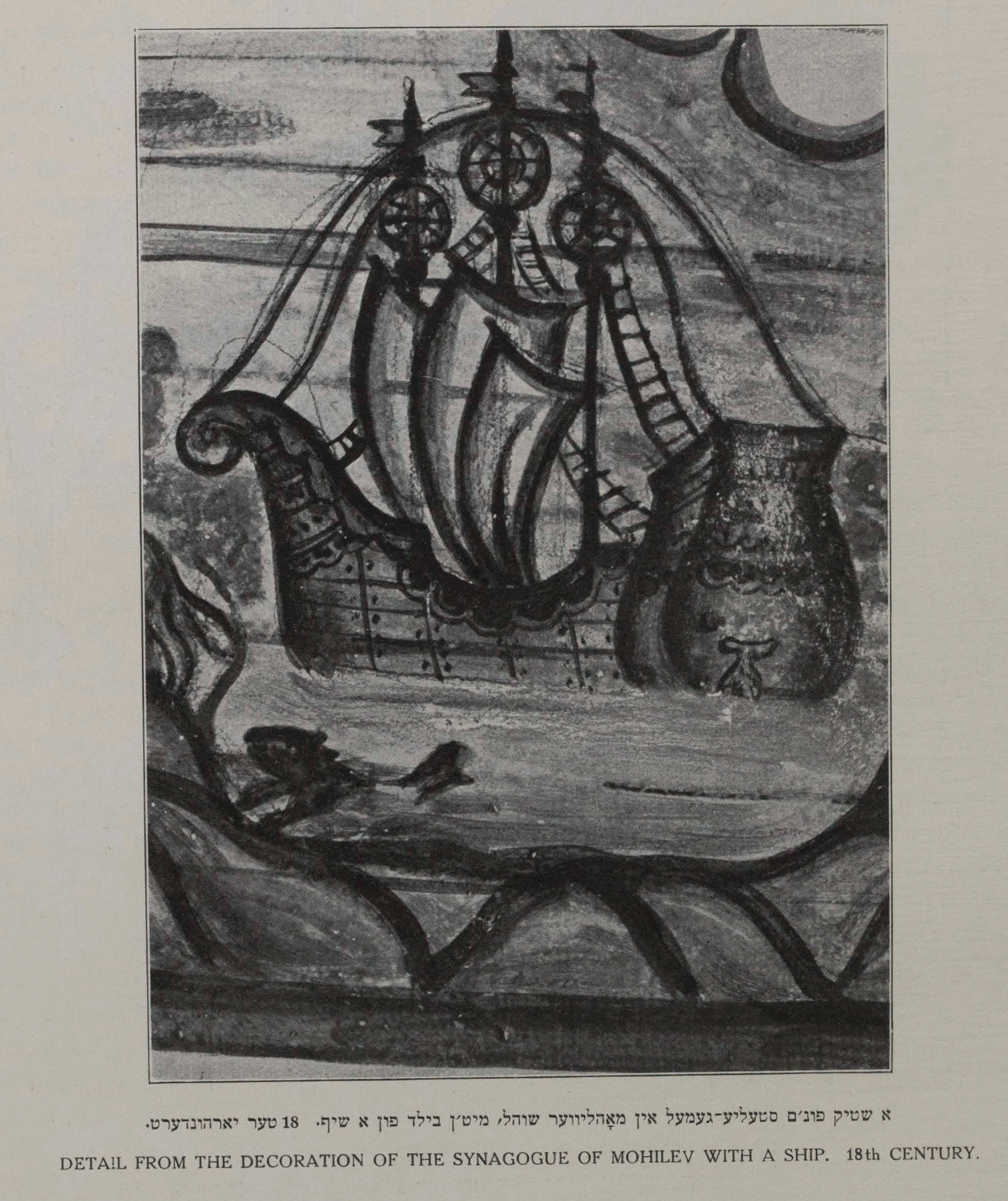

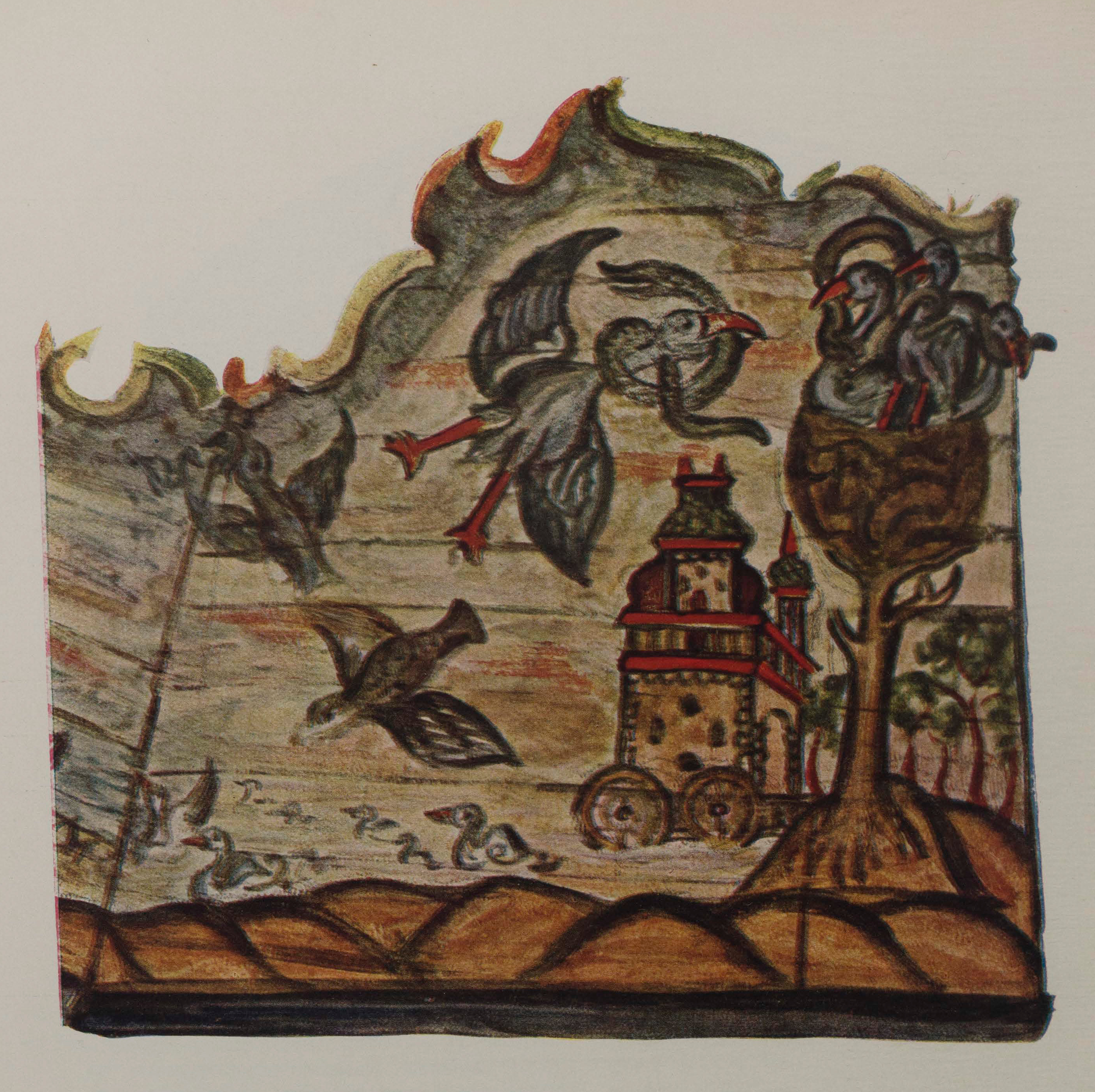

Rachel Wischnitzer proposed that Chaim Segal was inspired for this set of three panels by the stories No. 1 and 15 from the Ma’aseh nissim (Hebrew: Story of Wonders), tales of Juspa Schammes (Note: Birth name: Nafthali Hirz Ha-Levi, ca. 1604–78, schammes is "beadle" in Yiddish, and means the caretaker of a synagogue (שמשׂ, shames, from Hebrew: שמש, šammāš, 'attendant').) of the Worms Synagogue, written in 1670 and published for the first time in 1696 in Amsterdam. Segal can be acquainted with the Juspa's stories from a book or from hearsay; it is also possible that he had travelled to Worms, as the inscriptions speaks of travels of "many days in the lands of the living". He may also had travelled in Galicia, were a lot of painted wooden synagogues exists at the time. Some of the motifs he used in the Mogilev synagogue, like the bear climbing on a tree for honey and the fox carrying away a goose, resembles murals in the synagogues in Jablonow and Kamianka Strumilova. (Note: See also photo of the mural with bears climbing on a tree from Jablonow.)

First panel depicts the punishment of Worms; two other panels conclude this story from a Messianic perspective. One depicts a boat sailing towards Jerusalem. Second – a nest of storks that rests in the Tree of Knowledge, and a mother stork bringing a snake to her young, who already hold snakes in their bills. Near the Tree – an architectural structure in the form of a tower on wheels: the image of the biblical Ark of the Covenant on the way to Jerusalem. Storks on the Tree of Knowledge symbolize true righteous people who are able to defeat snakes, that is, satanic forces. The symbol is based on the consonance of the words "Hasidim" ("righteous") and "Hassida" ("stork") in the Hebrew language.

In story No. 1, Juspa tells how the city of Worms was punished for the refusal of its wise men in exile to return to Jerusalem. Historian Shlomo Eidelberg of the Yeshiva University in New York notes that on the mural of the Cold Synagogue the name "Worms" on the tower was spelled the same way as in Juspa's book - ווירמש. The city of Jerusalem is labeled as ירושלים עיר הקודש (the Holy City of Jerusalem).

In story No. 15, Juspa wrote the legend about the dragon, and stated that because of the lint wurm the city was named "Worms":

In olden times, the following incident occurred in the great city of Worms: A fiery serpent [lint wurm] flew from the desert and nested near the wall of the city, causing great damage. It destroyed many houses, swallowed up men and animals, and ruined everything it touched. The lint wurm was frightfully huge and had two legs. From the rear, it resembled a snake-like worm, only fatter and larger. It had such enormous, fiery eyes and large teeth in its mouth that fear would envelope all who saw it. A likeness of this [serpent] was designed on the Mint in the Worms marketplace. Arrows were ineffective against the monster. People did not yet know how to shoot with firearms, and the use of gunpowder had not yet been discovered: the Christian faith had not yet reached Worms at that time. There was no king in Worms at that time, but a widowed queen ruled the entire country. To pacify the lint wurm, the residents of the city had to cast a living person over the [city] wall. The monster would cause no further damage on a day it devoured a human being. The names of all the residents were entered into a book and a lottery cast. The "winner" would be thrown to the serpent.

— Juspa the Shammes, Ma’aseh nissim

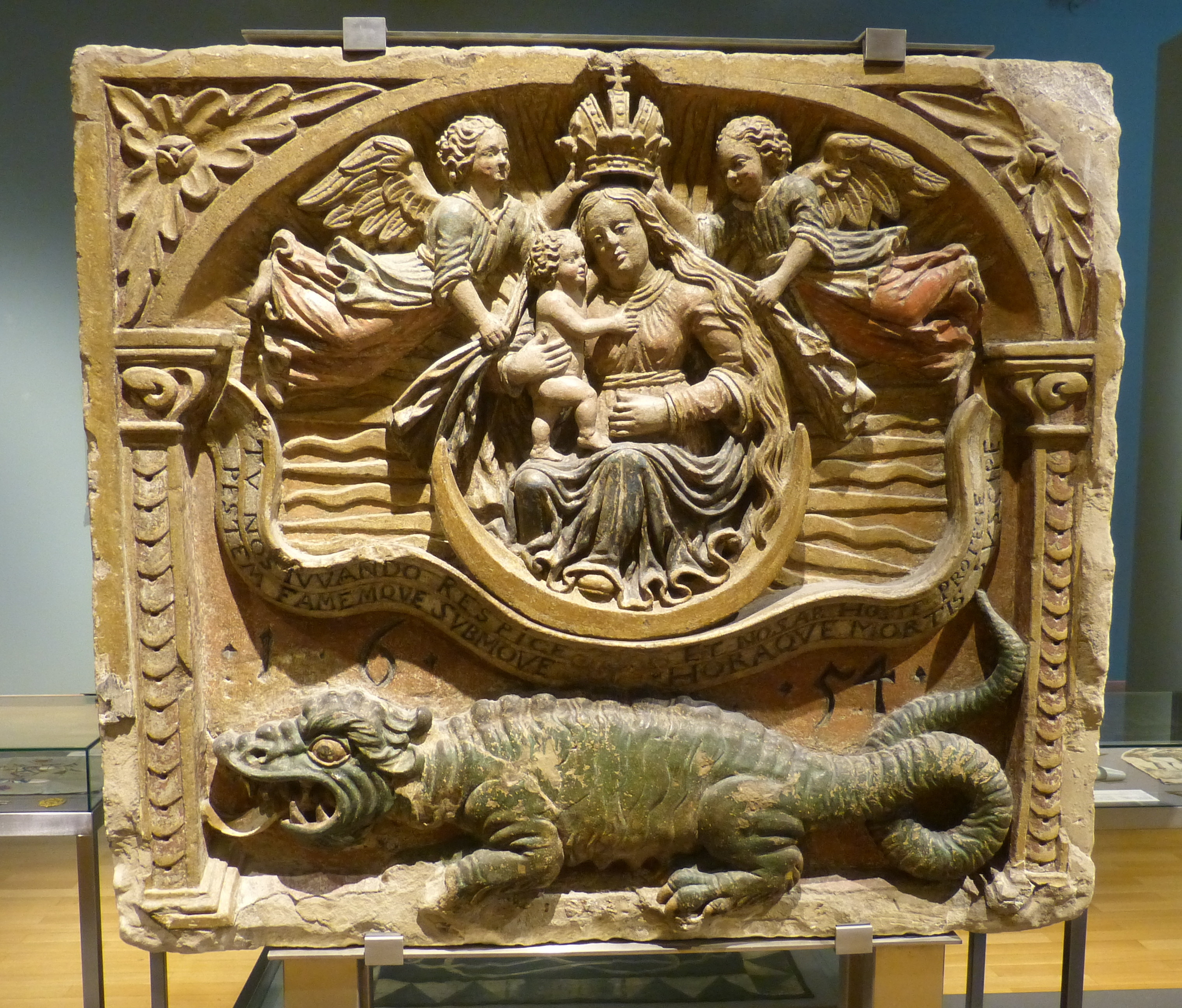
House sign with lintwurm, Vienna, 1566

The same monster, "lintwurm", appeared on the medieval seals of the bishops of Worms, and was a motif familiar for its citizens. According to English archaeologist Charles Boutell, a lindworm is basically "a dragon without wings." Lindwurms can be found on coat-of-arms of many German towns, and in art.

Art historian Ilia Rodov of Bar-Ilan University notes that "Juspa’s tale is a version of the popular German legend relating that the dragon of Worms was slain by Siegfried. This legend appeared by the turn of the thirteenth century in the chapter “How Siegfried Came to Worms” of the Nibelung epos." He also noted that the painting of Segal is very close to the description of serpent from Juspa's book, and that "[t]he Jerusalem-Worms contraposition in synagogue art is known to us as Hayim Segal's exclusive innovation. Much more frequent in east-European synagogue art were expressions of the antithesis ‘Jerusalem versus Babylon’." The only other known depiction of such Jerusalem-Worms contraposition was on the murals in the synagogue of Kopys, also made by Chaim Segal, that were a copies of the murals from Mogilev.

Jerusalem (left) and its antipode, the cursed city of Worms (right).
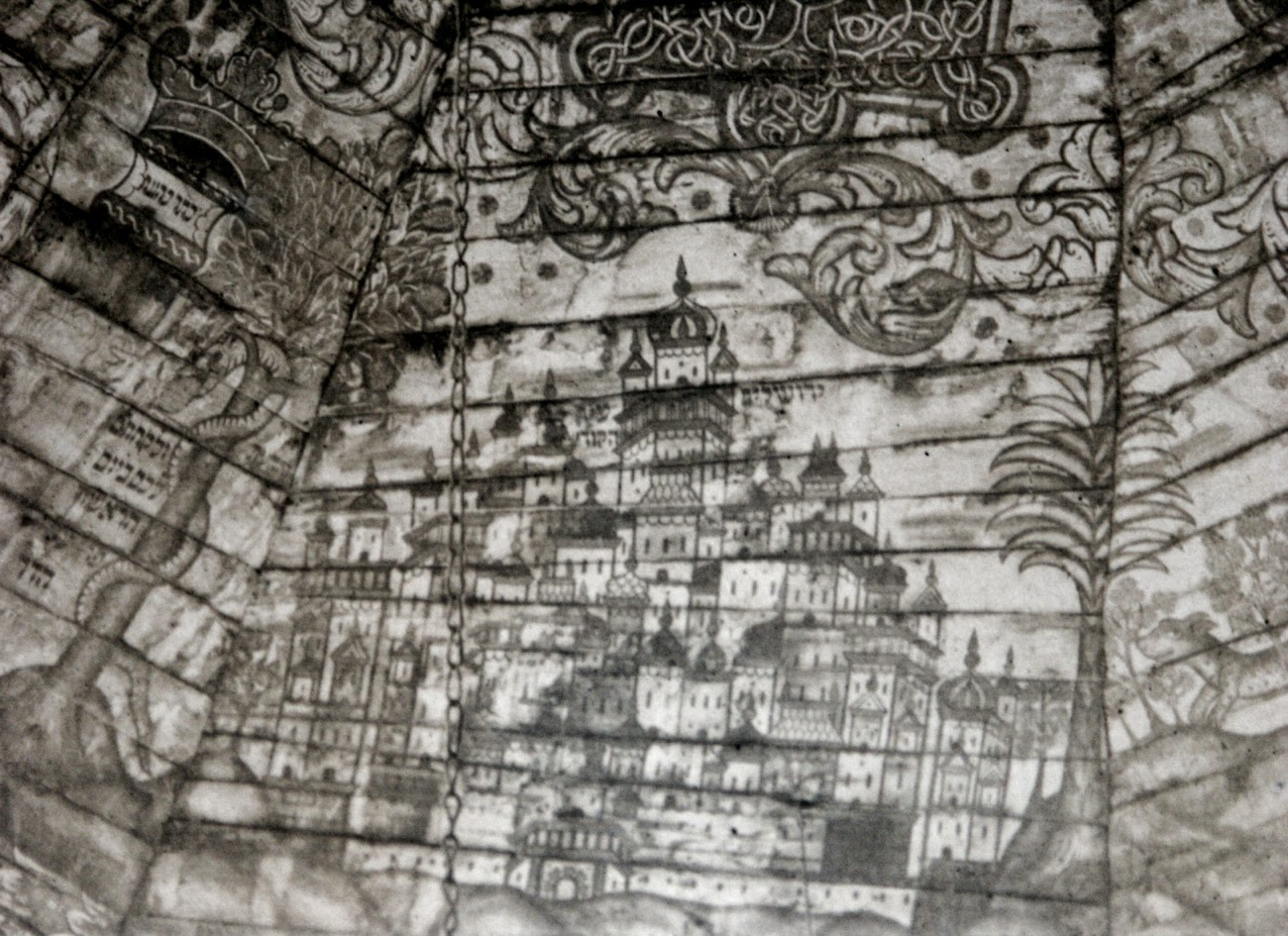
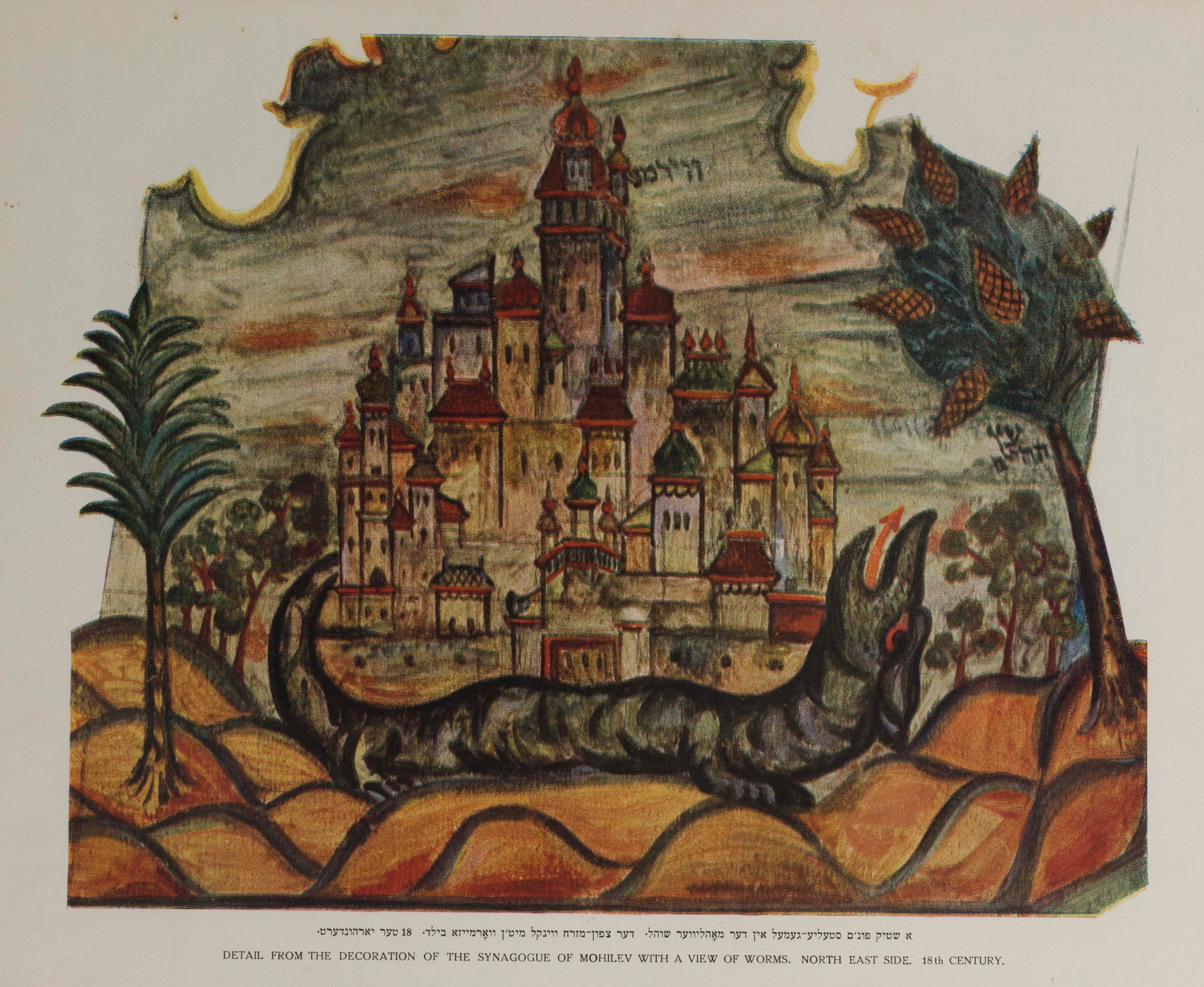
"On the sides are two panels—to the left on the southern wall a “vormayse,” depicting the cursed city of Worms encircled by some kind of dragon, and a tree of life. On the other side, in the northwest—Jerusalem and the tree of knowledge."

Wischnitzer published several articles about the Mogilev synagogue and interpretation of Segal's murals. Writing about Worms and Jerusalem on the opposite section of the ceiling and the sailboats depicted near these cities, she called it "an illustration of the legend about Jewish sages from Worms who declined an invitation by Ezra to return to Jerusalem with the exiles who were returning from Babylon after seventy years of captivity, because, they said, they were perfectly content to remain in Worms." "In other words, they preferred their well-being in exile to spiritual obligations toward the Holy Land. Juspa [the Shammes] concluded that the persecutions which the Jews of Worms suffered afterwards came as chastisement for their objection to return to the Promised Land. Hayim Segal’s terrible dragon with a red eye and a long arrow-like tongue is thus a personification of divine anger punishing the town." According to Wischnitzer, Segal had altered this story by adding a happy-ending. "The sailing vessel, which he introduced from his own imagination, denotes travel, or the eventual return of the exiles to the Holy Land. The storks - "the pious" - are shown partaking of snakes: the leviathan on which the pious will feast in the days of the Messiah. the wheeled structure is the wandering Ark of the Covenant which accompanied the Israelites on various occasions. It vanished when the First temple was destroyed; and it will reappear in the days of the Messiah. Segal ends the Worms legend on a happy note, looking to a time when no Jew will prefer exile to life in the Holy Land."

== Deterioration and demolition ==
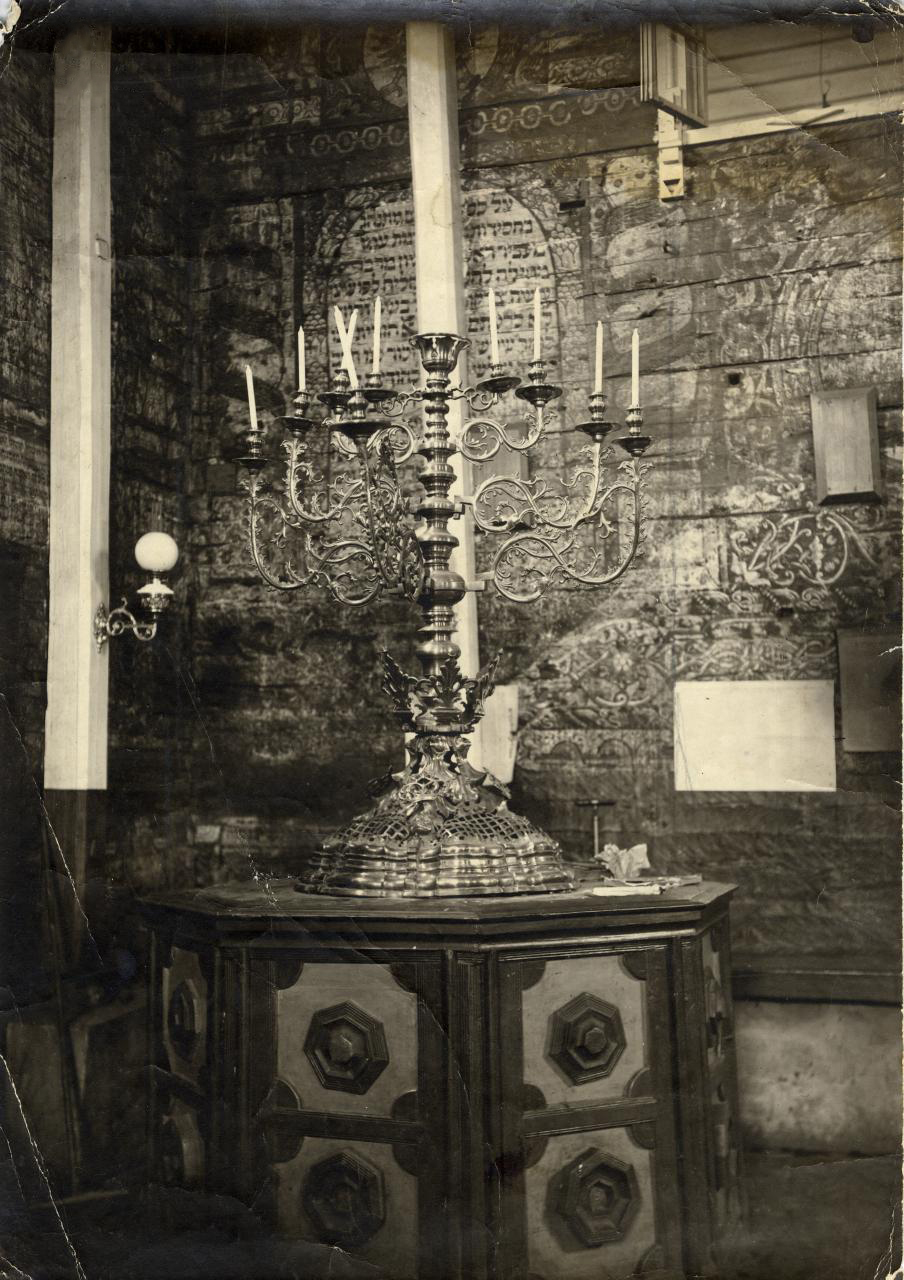
Hanukkiah in the synagogue

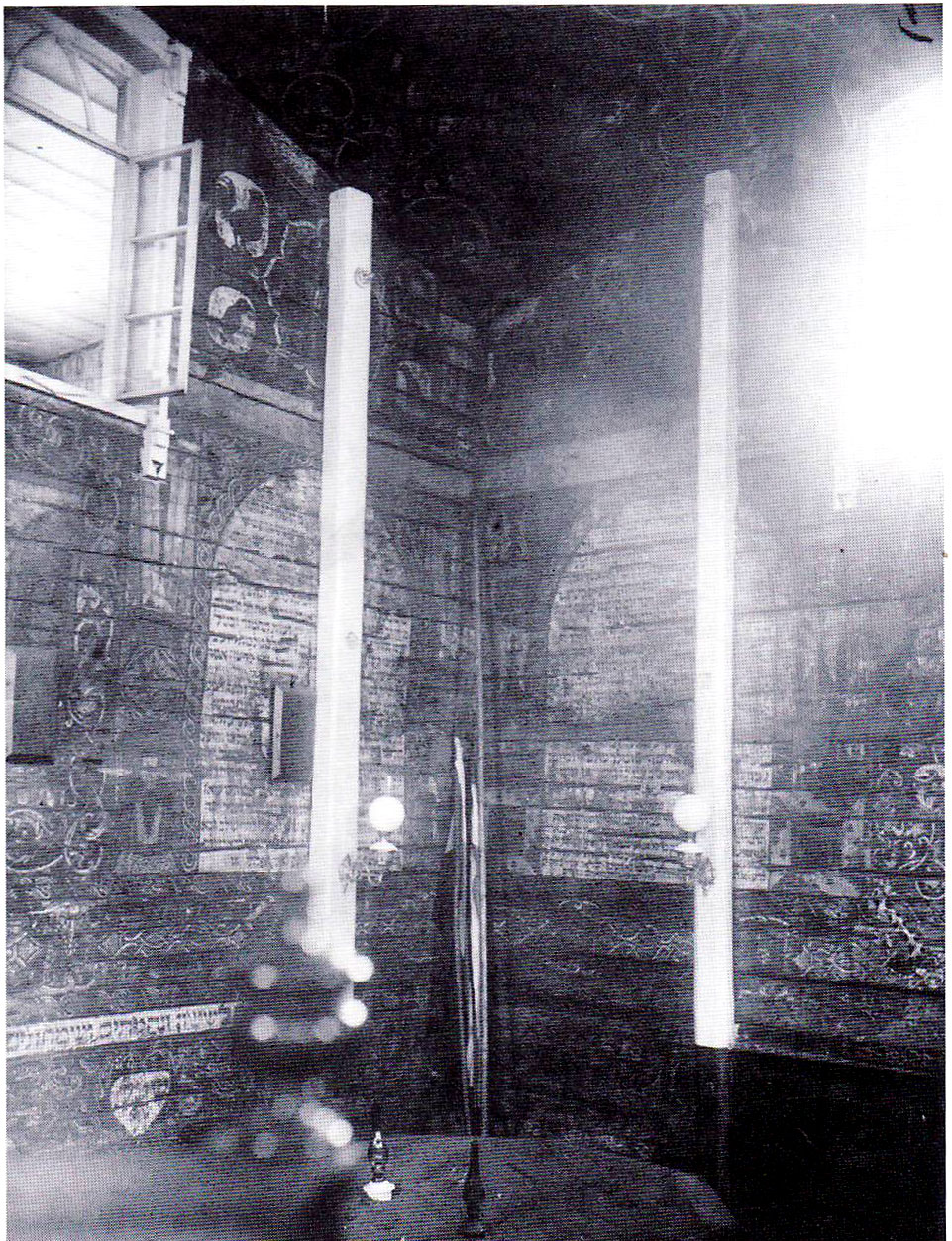
Decorations inside the synagogue

In 1937 Belarusian Soviet writers Jurka Vićbič and Źmitrok Biadula visited Mogilev; they found the Cold Synagogue in deteriorated state. Religious life was persecuted under the Soviet regime, and a lot of religious building were either destroyed or used as warehouses. The article that Vićbič wrote about the synagogue in 1971, "It was in Mogilev" ("Она была в Могилёве"), is the only known testimony of the latest days of the synagogue.

In Belarus, in Mogilev, there was an old wooden synagogue, from which that part of the city was generally called Školišča. It was built in 1626, when King Sigismund III of Poland allowed Mogilev Jews to settle only here, but not in the castle. It was miraculously passed in 1708 by a fire that, by order of Emperor Peter the Great, destroyed almost all of Mogilev. In 1937 I had to visit it together with Samuil Plavnik, a former pupil of the Jewish theological seminary - Yeshibot, who became one of the most popular Belarusian writers under the pseudonym Źmitrok Biadula.

We were looking for her for a long time then, since passers-by, when asked about her, either suspiciously examined us from head to toe, like some provocateurs, or condescendingly, if not contemptuously, smiled - there are still, they say, ancient subjects not of this world, who in the final year of the second Stalinist five-year plan are looking for a synagogue. Only when Źmitrok Biadula addressed the old Mogilever in Yiddish, he, first looking around, willingly and in detail explained to us how to get into it.

Even from a distance, we recognized it by its high, multi-layered roof with curved slopes, which defines the characteristic silhouette of most synagogues in Belarus. And finally, through the wide open doors, we enter it. During its long existence, it, modest in size, contained a sea of human grief, which on the holiday of Yom Kippur was illuminated with a joyful exclamation of hope under the sounds of a ritual horn - shofar: Lshono Gaboa Biyrushalaym! - which in Hebrew means - next year in Jerusalem! The inside of the synagogue was painted by the talented hand of Chagall - Marc Chagall's great-grandfather. Unusual for synagogues in general, the wall painting here, bypassing the prohibitions of the Talmud, filled the entire building with inspirational symbols of the biblical prophets, now covered below... with obscene inscriptions in charcoal and chalk. Of the four columns at the corners of the pulpit of the bimah, supporting the vault, one was apparently deliberately knocked down, and the latter was sideways, threatening to fall. In the windows, not only the glass, but also the frames were broken. Scraps of tattered sacred BOOKS were scattered on the floor, spoiled with filth.

Two years later I had to come to Mogilev again, but, hurrying along the road I already knew to the synagogue, I did not even see the foundation in its place. In 1938 it was dismantled, and the logs (that were almost petrified from antiquity and at the same time without a single crack) were used for wells.

— Jurka Vićbič, It was in Mogilev (Note: В Белоруссии, в Могилёве, имелась старинная деревянная синагога, от которой вообще та часть города получила название Школище. Она была построена в 1626 г., когда король Сигизмунд Третий разрешил могилёвским евреям селиться только здесь, но не в замке. Ее чудом миновал в 1708 г. пожар, уничтоживший по приказу императора Петра Первого почти весь Могилев. В 1937 г. мне пришлось побывать в ней вместе с бывшим воспитанником еврейской духовной семинарии-ешибота Самуилом Плавником, ставшим под псевдонимом Змитрок Бядуля одним из наиболее популярных белорусских писателей. Мы долго искали её тогда, так как встречные на вопросы о ней либо подозрительно осматривали нас с головы до ног, как неких провокаторов, либо снисходительно, если не презрительно, улыбались — есть ещё, мол, допотопные субъекты не от мира сего, которые в завершающем году второй сталинской пятилетки разыскивают синагогу. Только когда Змитрок Бядуля по-еврейски обратился к старому могилевчанину, тот, сперва оглянувшись, охотно и подробно объяснил нам, как в нее попасть. Ещё издали мы узнали её по высокой, многослойной, с криволинейными скатами крыше, определяющей характерный силуэт большинства синагог Белоруссии. И вот наконец через открытые настежь двери мы входим в нее. Во время своего долгого существования она, скромная по размерам, вмещала море человеческого горя, которое на праздник Йом Кипур под звуки ритуального рога-шофора освещалось радостным возгласом-надеждой: Лшоно Габоа Бийрушалайм! —что на древнееврейском языке означает — в будущем году в Иерусалиме! Внутри синагога была расписана талантливой рукой Шагала — прадеда Марка Шагала. Необычная вообще для синагог, стенная живопись здесь, обойдя запреты Талмуда, до предела наполнила все здание вдохновенной и вещей символикой библейских пророков, покрытой теперь внизу... нецензурными надписями углем и мелом. Из четырех колонн по углам амвона бимы, поддерживающих свод, одна была, очевидно, умышленно повалена, и тот покосился, угрожая падением. В окнах не только были выбиты все стекла, но и переломаны переплеты рам. На полу, загаженном нечистотами, валялись клочки изодранных священных КНИГ. Спустя два года мне пришлось снова приехать в Могилёв, но, торопясь по знакомой мне уже дороге до синагоги, я на её месте не увидел даже фундамента. В 1938 году её разобрали, а словно окаменевшие от древности и вместе с тем без единой трещины бревна использовали для колодезных срубов. Только в местном краеведческом музее сохранилось несколько фотоснимков с неё, но не с её уничтоженной живописи, а также документальные данные, что она действительно была расписана Шагалом.)

== Gallery ==
Paintings from the synagogue by Chaim Segal, copied by El Lissitzky

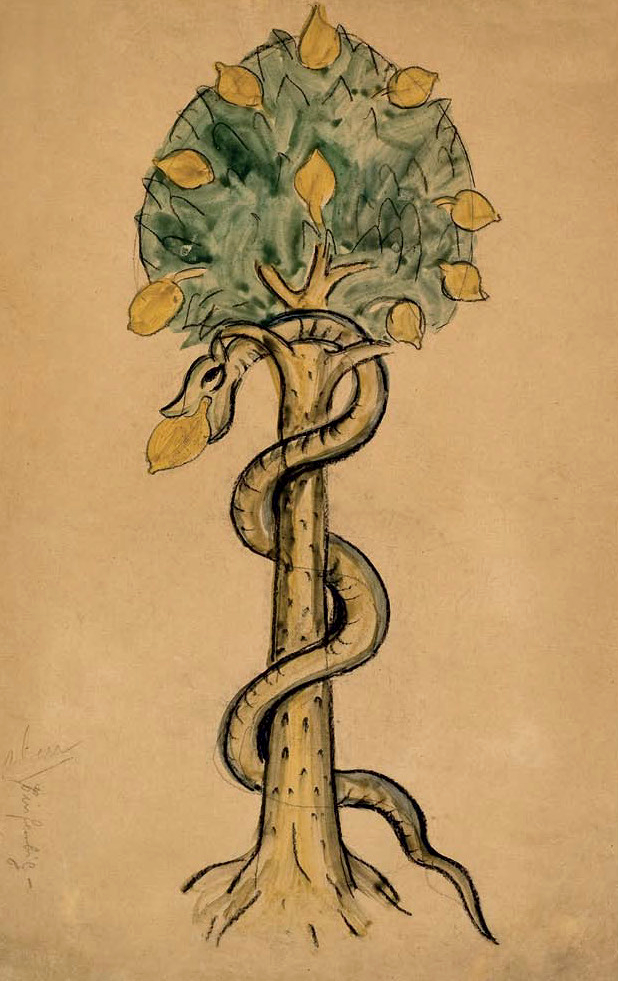
The Garden of Eden Serpent

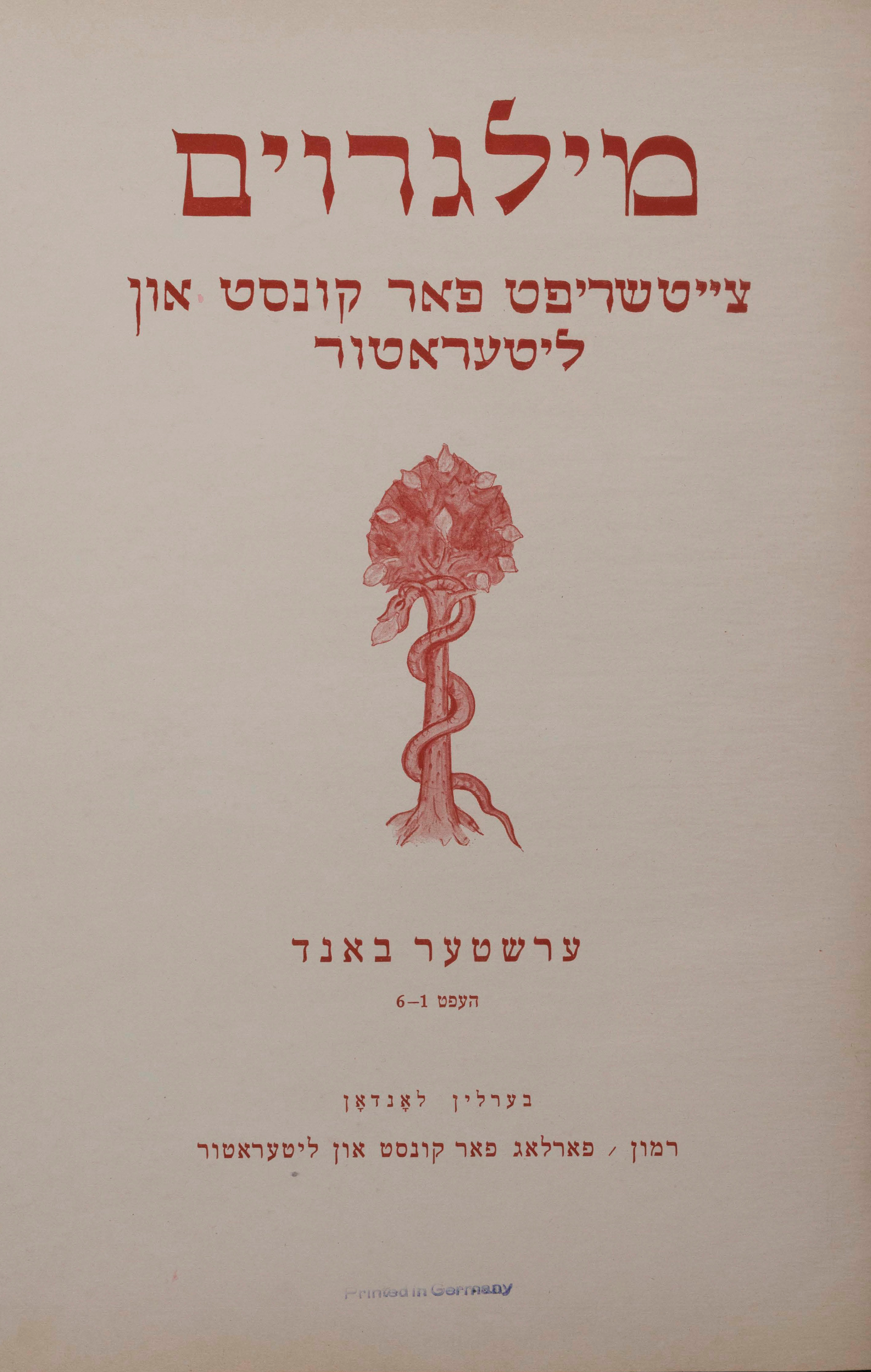
Title page of the first issue of Rimon-Milgroim, 1923

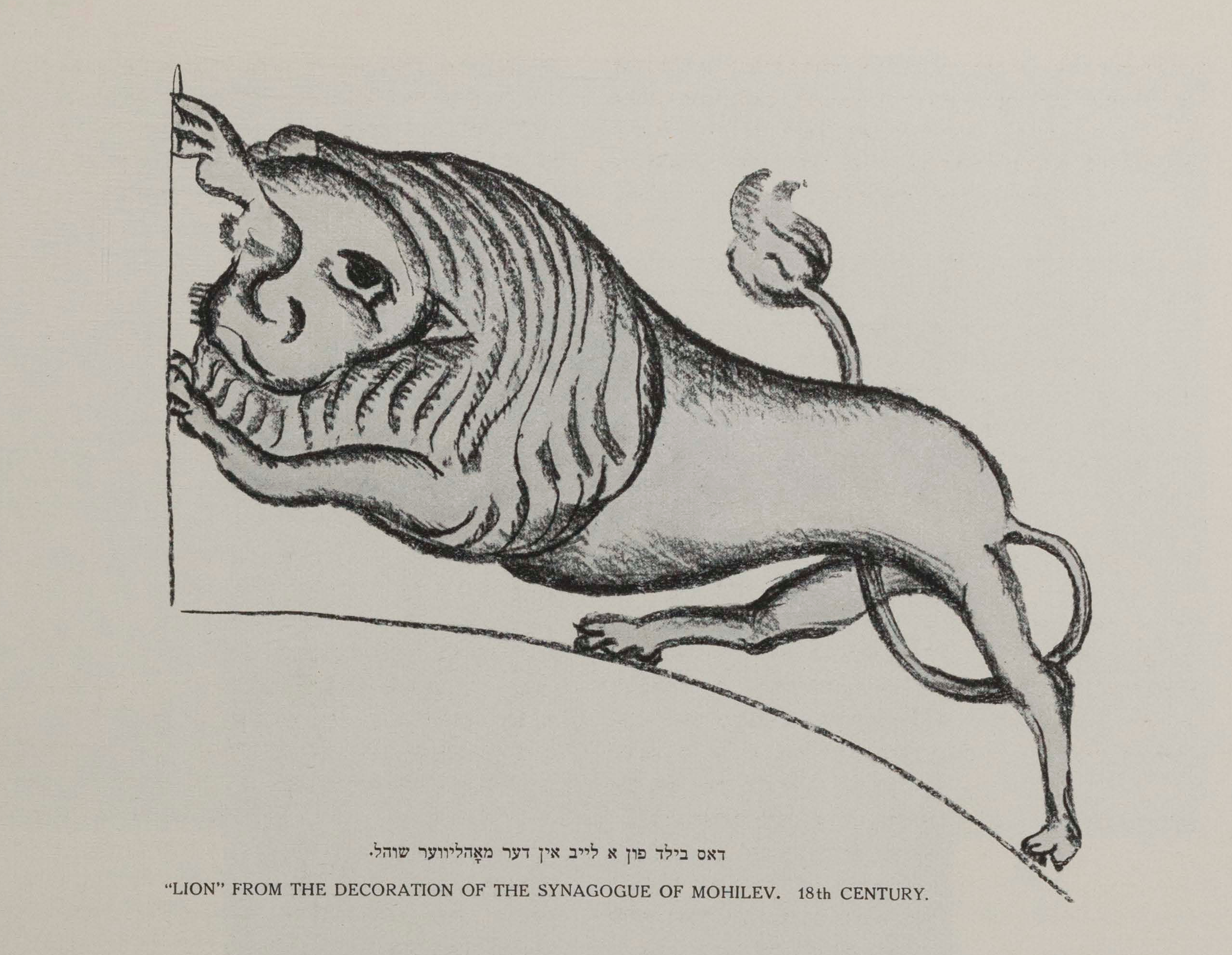
Lion. Copy of a wall painting above the entrance of the synagogue

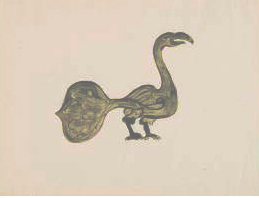
Peacock, after a wall painting on the west side of the synagogue

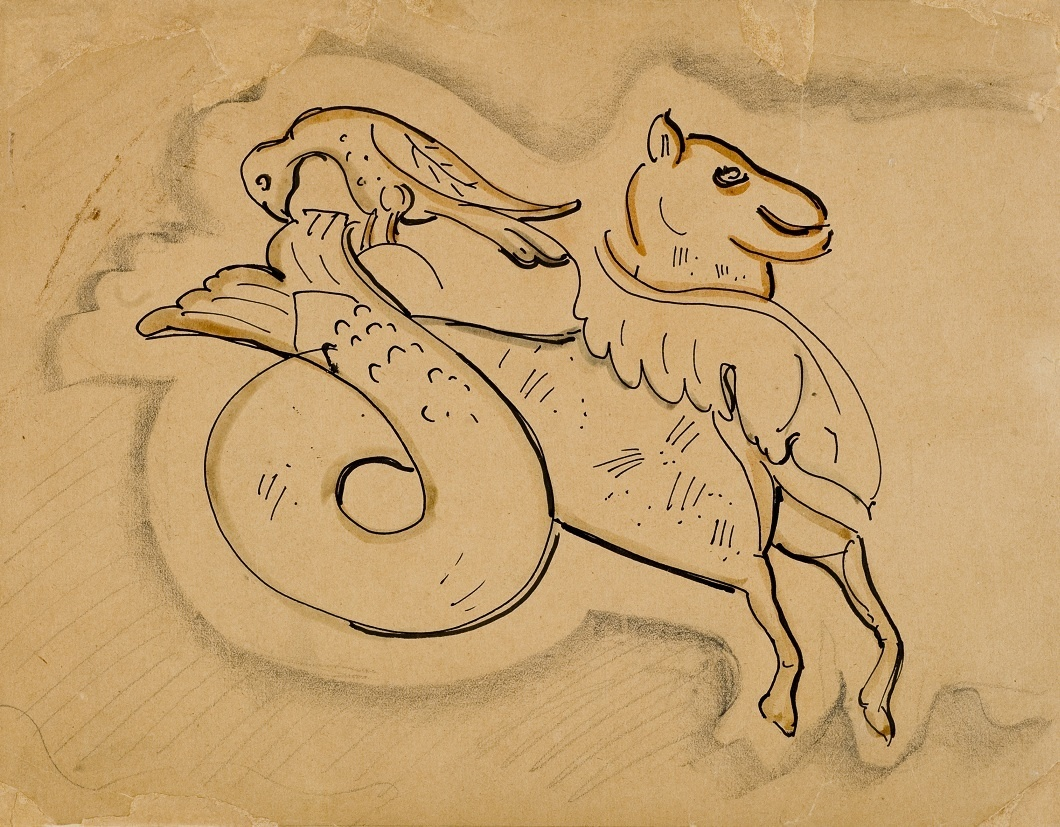
Sea Horse and Bird from Druya synagogue

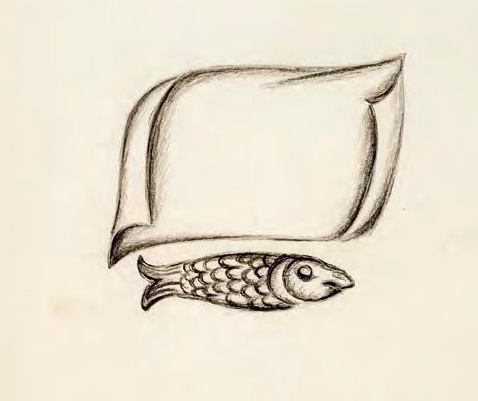
Copy of a decorative motif (fish) from a synagogue (Note: Painting made either by El Lissitzky or Issachar Ber Ryback)

== Sources ==
- Kantsedikas, Alexander (2017). El Lissitzky. The Jewish Period. London: Unicorn Press. ISBN 978-1910787960.
- Wischnitzer, Rachel (1964). "Chapter Seven. The Wooden Synagogue - Central Plan: Eastern Europe / 16th to 18th Centuries". The Architecture of the European Synagogue. Philadelphia: The Jewish Publication Society of America. ASIN B000V2IRN4.
- Chagall, Marc (1918). Marc Chagall on Art and Culture: Including the First Book on Chagall's Art by A. Efros and Ya. Tugendhold. Moscow. ISBN 9780804748315.
- Eidelberg, Shlomo (1991). R. Juspa, Shammash of Warmaisa (Worms). Jewish Life in 17th Century Worms. Magnes Press. ISBN 9652237620.
