= Mark Wischnitzer =

Jewish historian (1882–1955)

- Born: May 10, 1882; Rovno, Russian Empire
- Died: October 15, 1955 (aged 73); Tel Aviv, Israel
- Education: University of Vienna; University of Berlin
- Occupation: Historian
- Spouse: Rachel Wischnitzer

Mark Wischnitzer (May 10, 1882 – October 15, 1955) was a scholar of Jewish history.

== Biography ==
Mark Wischnitzer was born on May 10, 1882, in Rivne, Ukraine which then belonged to the Russian Empire. He studied at the University of Vienna and University of Berlin, and he received his doctorate in 1906. Wischnitzer served as editor of the history section of the Russian-language Jewish Encyclopedia from 1908 to 1913, and later as the editor of the Encyclopaedia Judaica published in Berlin. During the First World War he served as an officer in the Austrian army. After the war he worked at the embassy of the short-lived Ukrainian People's Republic in London. In 1921, he moved to Berlin, Germany. There he served as Secretary General of the Hilfsverein der Deutschen Juden until he and his family emigrated to France in 1938. In Paris he was a research associate of the American Jewish Joint Distribution Committee from 1938 to 1940. Wischnitzer immigrated to the United States in 1941. From 1941 to 1949, he was a research associate for the Council of Jewish Federations and Welfare Funds. Starting in 1948, he was on the faculty of Yeshiva University as professor of Jewish history in the graduate school.

Mark Wischnitzer died on October 15, 1955, in Tel Aviv, Israel, of a heart attack. He was married to art historian Rachel Wischnitzer. They had one son, Leonard James.

== Books ==
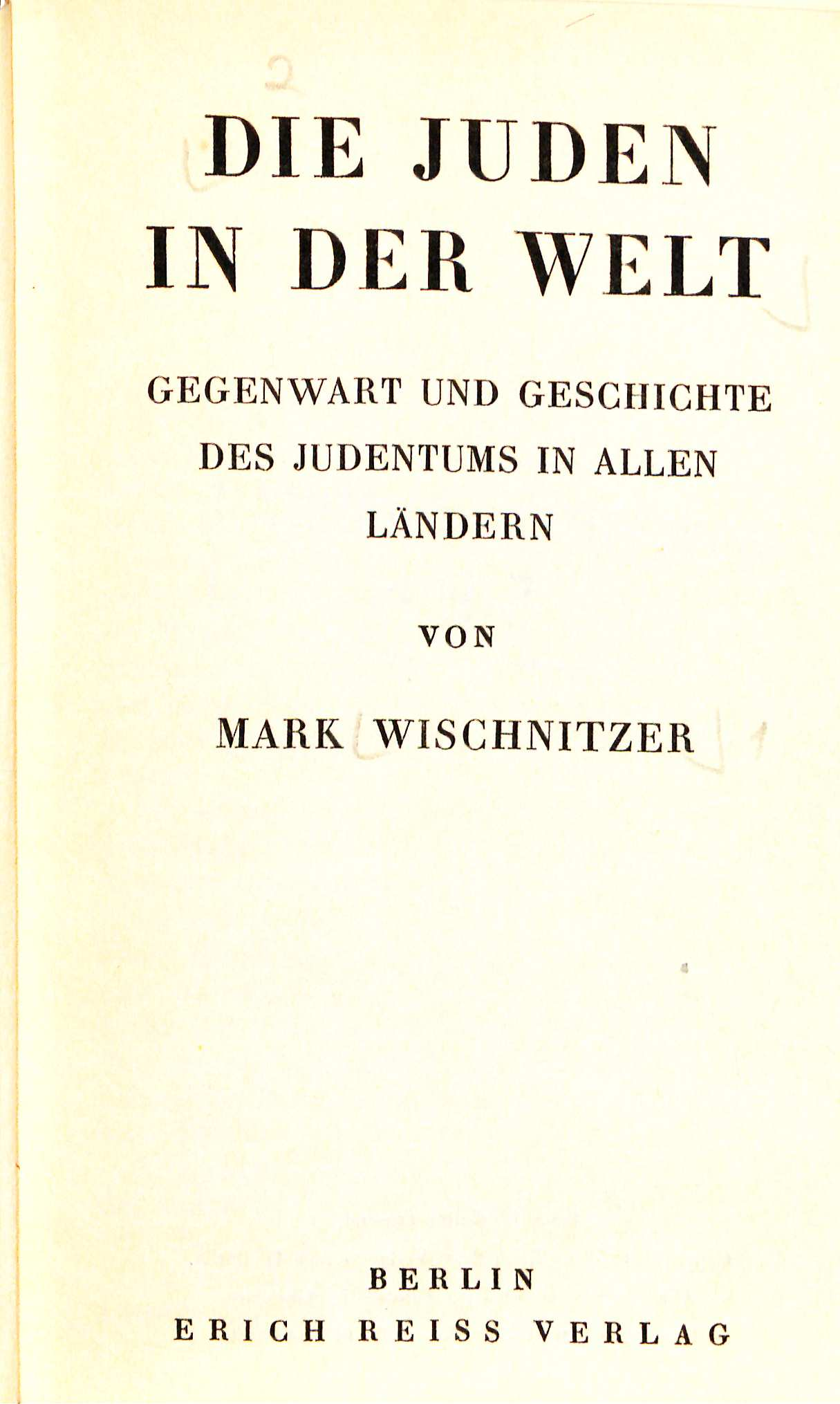
Cover of Die Juden in der Welt

- Die Universität Göttingen und die Entwicklung der liberalen Ideen in Russland im ersten Viertel des 19. Jahrhunderts, Berlin: Ebering, 1907
- Die jüdische Zunftverfassung in Polen und Litauen im 17. une 18. Jahrhundert, Stuttgart: W. Kohlhammer, 1927
- Die Juden in der Welt: Gegenwart und Geschichte des Judentums in allen Ländern, Berlin: Reiss, 1935
- To dwell in safety: the story of Jewish migration since 1800, Philadelphia: Jewish Publication Society of America, 1949
- Visas to freedom: the history of HIAS, Cleveland: World Pub. Co., 1956
