= Rachel Wischnitzer =

Architect and art historian (1884–1989)

Rachel Bernstein Wischnitzer
- Born: April 14, 1885; Minsk, Russian Empire
- Died: November 20, 1989 (aged 104)
- Education: Heidelberg University
- Occupations: Architect, art historian
- Spouse: Mark Wischnitzer

Rachel Bernstein Wischnitzer (German: Rahel Wischnitzer-Bernstein), (April 14, 1885 – November 20, 1989) was a Russian-born architect and art historian.

== Biography ==
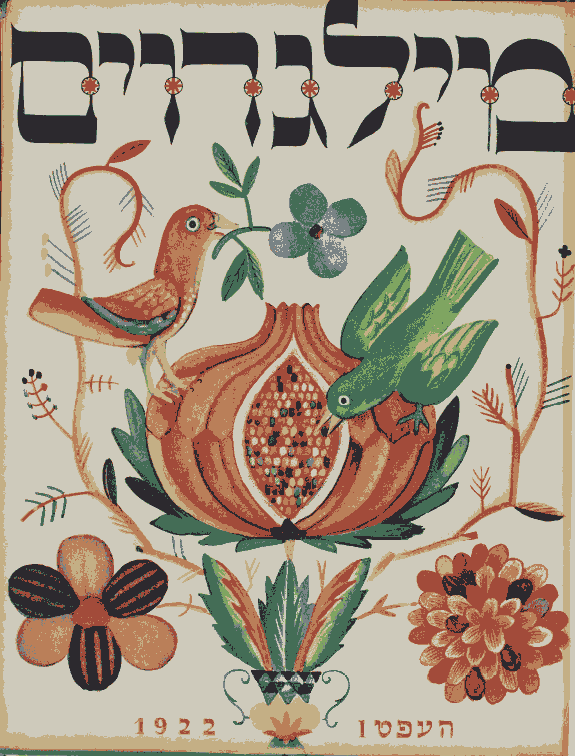
The first issue of the Milgroym journal, 1922

Wischnitzer was born into a middle-class Jewish family in Minsk, in the Russian Empire, the daughter of Wladimir and Sophie (Halpern) Bernstein. Rachel's father was for a time in the insurance business. She had one sibling, a younger brother, Gustave, who later became a chemist. She learned Hebrew as a child, and her family observed the major Jewish holidays. After her family moved to Warsaw, she attended a state gymnasium there. At school, she became interested in mathematics and the natural sciences. She learned French and German, and took private lessons in Polish. At this time she also developed an interest in Jewish history and culture.

Wischnitzer studied at Heidelberg University from 1902 to 1903. She went on to study architecture in Brussels, at the Academie Nationale des Beaux-Arts, and in 1907 graduated from the École Spéciale d'Architecture in Paris, one of the first women to receive a degree in that field. She also studied art history for two semesters at the Ludwig-Maximilians-Universität München in 1909 to 1910. After her return to Russia, she continued to publish scholarly articles and reviews, and to develop her ideas about Jewish art. She was especially interested in illuminated medieval Hebrew manuscripts, which she studied in the collections of St. Petersburg.

In 1912, Rachel (Bernstein) married Mark Wischnitzer (1882–1955), a sociologist and historian, who was one of the editors of the Russian-language edition of the Jewish Encyclopedia (Evreiskaia entsiklopediia), where her first writings on synagogue architecture and ceremonial objects were published. The couple moved to Berlin in the 1920s, where they together launched the Hebrew and Yiddish illustrated companion journals Rimon–Milgroim. Featuring perspectives on art, literature and scholarship by both East European and German-Jewish writers and artists, six issues of the journal appeared between 1922 and 1924, with Mark serving as general editor and Rachel Wischnitzer as artistic editor.

During her time in Berlin, Rachel Wischnitzer was also art and architecture editor of the Encyclopaedia Judaica, from 1928 to 1934, and worked with the Jewish Museum Berlin, in part as a curator, from 1928 to 1938. She was one of the most important Jewish art critics of the century.

Rachel and Mark Wischnitzer, together with their son, Leonard (born in 1924), fled Nazi Germany in 1938, emigrating at first to Paris. From there Rachel and Leonard left for the United States in 1940, with Mark joining them in the following year.

Now in her fifties, Wischnitzer returned to formal academic study at the Institute of Fine Arts at New York University, where she earned a master's degree in 1944. During that time she was a research fellow of the American Academy for Jewish Research. Later, she was a professor at Stern College for Women of Yeshiva University, from 1956 until she retired in 1968.

== Books ==
- 1935: Symbole und Gestalten der jüdischen Kunst. Berlin-Schöneberg: Siegfried Scholem (in German); English translation (by Renata Stein) - 2022: Symbols and Forms in Jewish Art, Cracow: IRSA, 2022 (with an essay on Wischnitzer's life and work by Shalom Sabar).
- 1948: The Messianic Theme in the Paintings of the Dura Synagogue, Chicago: University of Chicago Press
- 1955: Synagogue Architecture in the United States, Philadelphia: Jewish Publication Society of America
- 1964: Architecture of the European Synagogue, Philadelphia: Jewish Publication Society of America, 1964
- 1990: From Dura to Rembrandt: studies in the history of art, Milwaukee: Aldrich; Vienna: IRSA Verlag; Jerusalem: Center for Jewish Art (collected essays)

== Biography ==
- Rachel Wischnitzer; Doyenne of Historians of Jewish Art, by Bezalel Narkiss, pp. 9–25, in From Dura Europa to Rembrandt: Studies in the History of Art, by Rachel Wischnitzer, 1990
- Shalom Sabar, “Rachel Wischnitzer: Life and Work,” in Rachel Wischnitzer-Bernstein, Symbols and Forms in Jewish Art (Cracow: IRSA, 2022), 171-206.
- Tobias Brinkmann, Between Borders: The Great Jewish Migration from Eastern Europe, New York 2024, esp. pp.189–205.

== See also ==
- Women in the art history field
