= Emil Gottlieb Schuback =

German painter

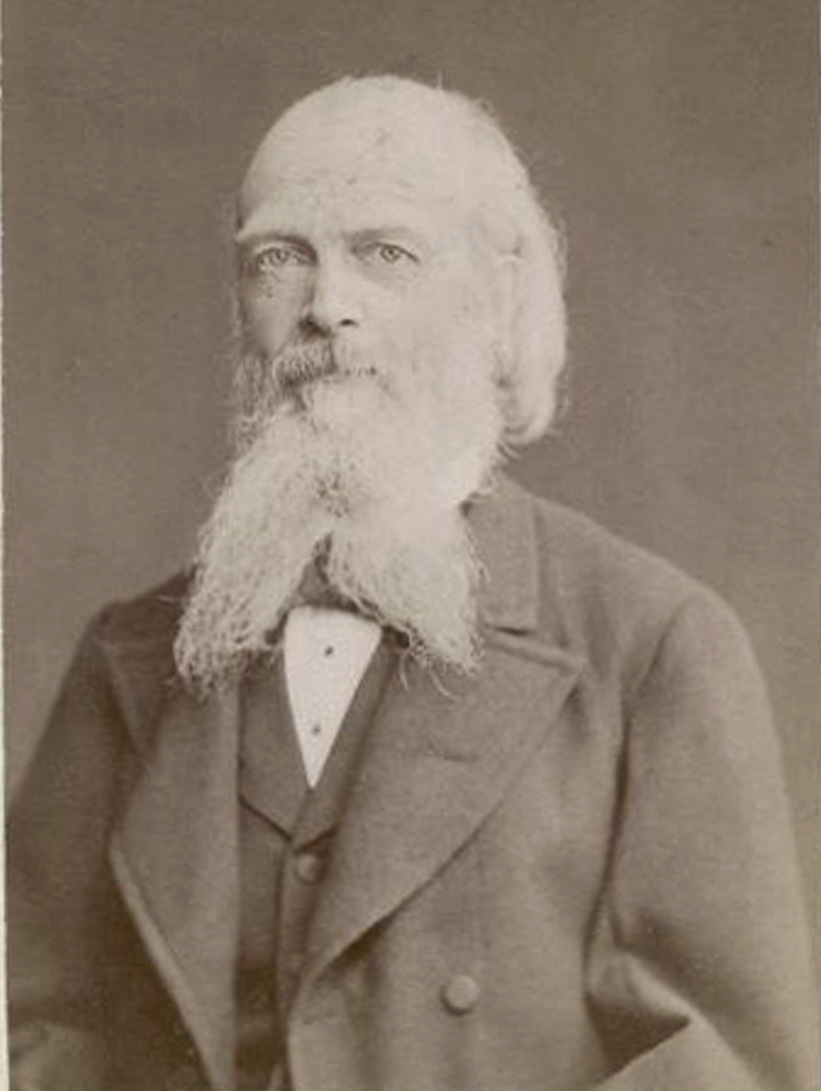
Emil Gottlieb Schuback (1877); photograph by Laura Lasinsky (fl. 1860s-1890s)

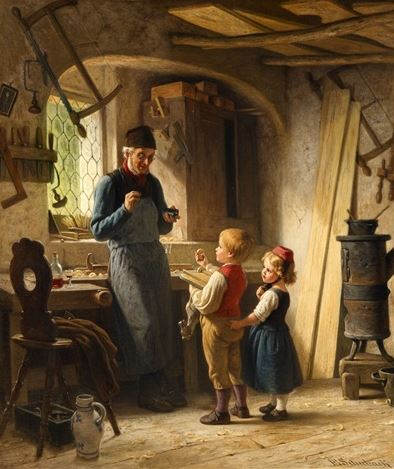
In Grandfather's Workshop

Emil Gottlieb Schuback (28 June 1820 – 14 March 1902) was a German genre painter and lithographer.

== Biography ==
He was born in Hamburg. He received his first painting lessons from Gerdt Hardorff at the Gelehrtenschule des Johanneums in Hamburg and became a member of the Klub Hamburgischer junger Künstler. At the age of sixteen, he went to Munich, where he studied with Peter von Cornelius and Heinrich Maria von Hess at the Academy of Fine Arts.

Working with Cornelius led him to become involved with the Nazarene movement so, in 1844, he went to Rome to join a group of like-minded German artists there; including Heinrich Dreber, Günther Gensler and the sculptor Heinrich Gerhardt.

Schuback returned to Hamburg in 1848, where he focused on genre and history painting. In 1855, he moved to Düsseldorf to polish his skills, working with the genre artist Rudolf Jordan, and becoming associated with the Düsseldorfer Malerschule. After that, he devoted himself exclusively to genre works. Many featured scenes from the lives of children, reflecting his wife Emma's occupation as an elementary school teacher. Later, she would establish her own school for girls, the "Schuback’schen Schule". The school was in operation until 1911.

He was also a member of the artists' association Malkasten (paintbox), and the Verein der Düsseldorfer Künstler.

In 1885, Schuback made another extended visit to Rome. He died in 1902 in Düsseldorf. A major retrospective was held at the Alte Kunsthalle shortly after his death.
