= Hermann Kauffmann =

German painter

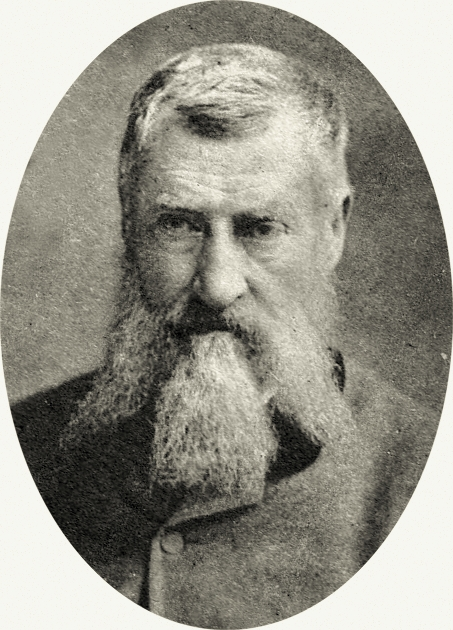
Hermann Kauffmann, photo, c. 1880

Hermann Kauffmann (the elder) also Herrmann Kauffmann (7 November 1808 – 24 May 1889) was a German painter and lithographer, and one of the main representatives of the Hamburger Schule.

== Biography ==
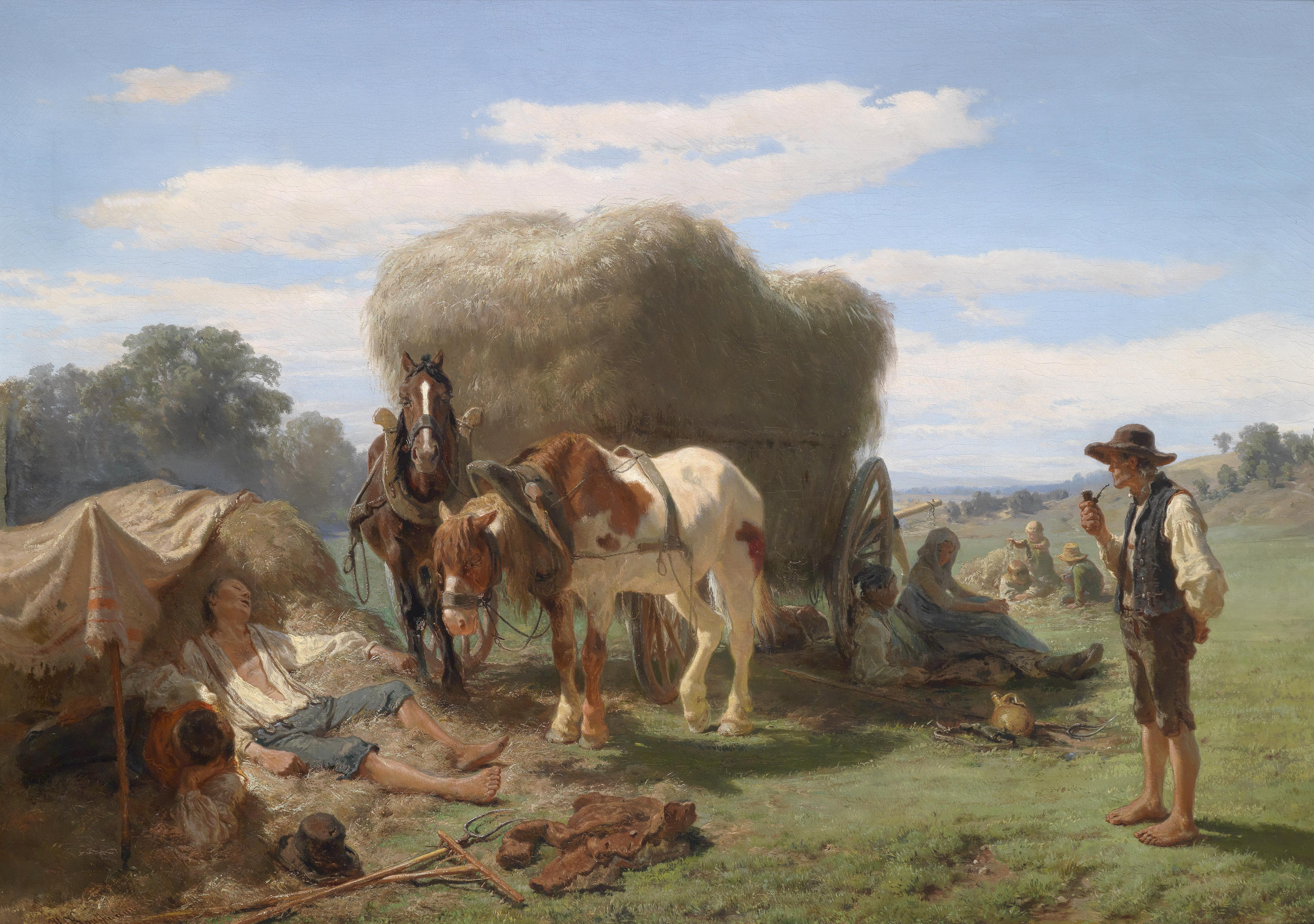
Rast bei der Ernte 1889

Hermann Kauffmann was born in Hamburg, the son of a merchant and of the daughter of a silk trader. His first teacher was the Hamburg painter Gerdt Hardorff. From 1827 to 1833 he studied at the Academy of Fine Arts, Munich; his teacher Peter Heß was one of the leading representatives of the Munich naturalists. Kauffmann then joined the Hamburg artists group in Munich, led by Andreas Borum, but soon left and studied nature. He returned to Hamburg in 1833.

His work continued to be influenced by the Bavarian landscape. He made further landscape studies during journeys to north and south Germany, to Norway, and in and around Hamburg. He favored winter landscapes, such as Postwagen im Schneesturm, Schlittenbahn auf der Elbe, Fischerszene auf dem Eis.

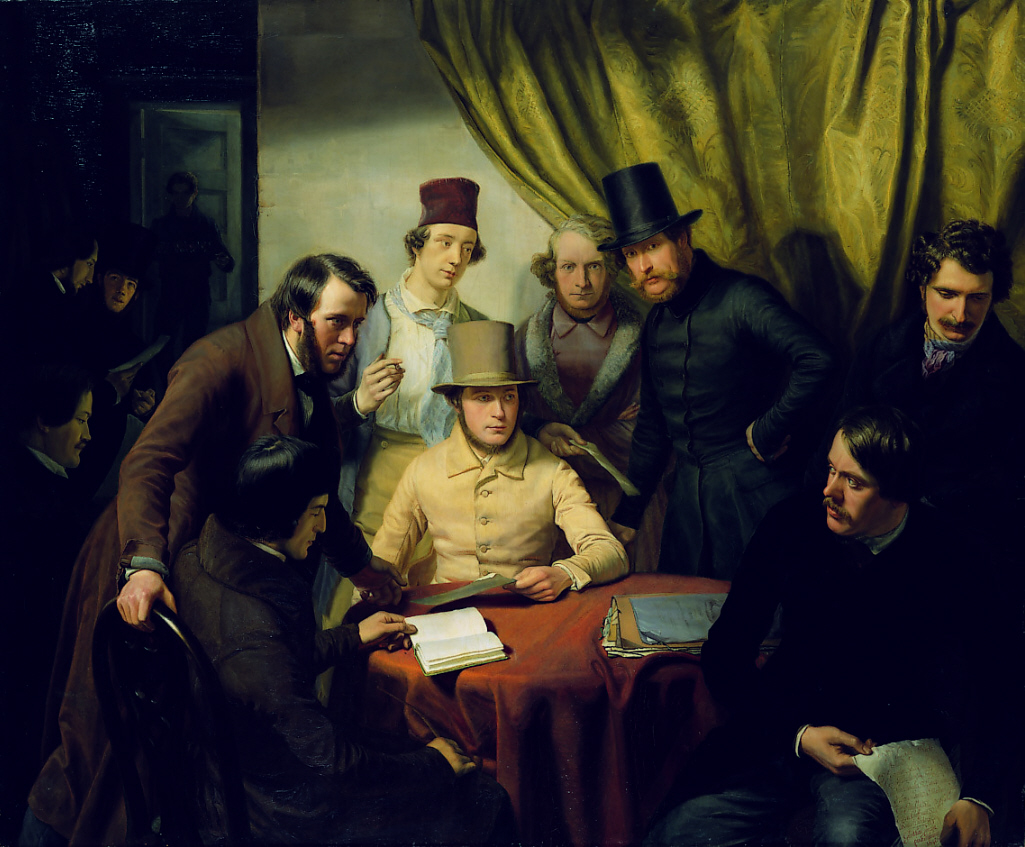
Günther Gensler, Die Mitglieder des Hamburger Künstlervereins (1840): Kauffmann standing, centre, wearing top hat

Works by Kauffmann are on display in Hamburg at the Hamburger Kunsthalle and in the museums at Darmstadt, Hannover and Leipzig, and his painting of the Great Fire of Hamburg hangs in the Hamburg town hall.

As a member of the Hamburg art society, he is immortalized in Günther Gensler's 1840 painting Die Mitglieder des Hamburger Künstlervereins.

He died in Hamburg in 1889. The Hermann-Kauffmann-Straße in Hamburg-Barmbek is named for him. His son Hugo Kauffmann was also a painter.

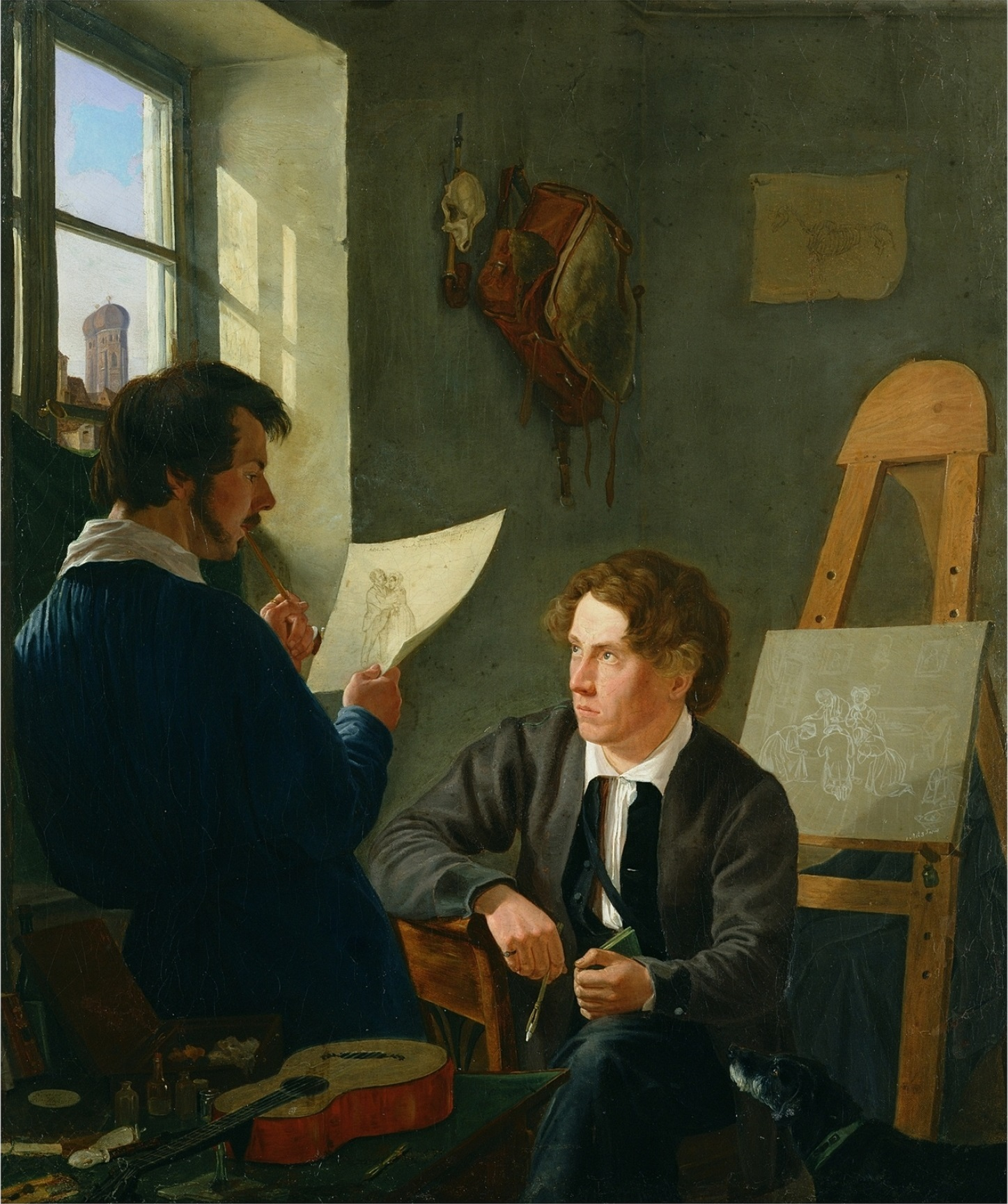
Painting by Kauffmann of the artist and Georg Haeselich in Kauffmann's atelier in Munich (1830)

== Notable works ==
=== Lithographs ===
- 1845: Am Soolbrunnen

=== Oil paintings ===
- 1830 Hermann Kaufmann und Georg Haeselich in Kauffmanns Atelier in München
- 1887: Die Heimkehr der Fischer, (Probstei)
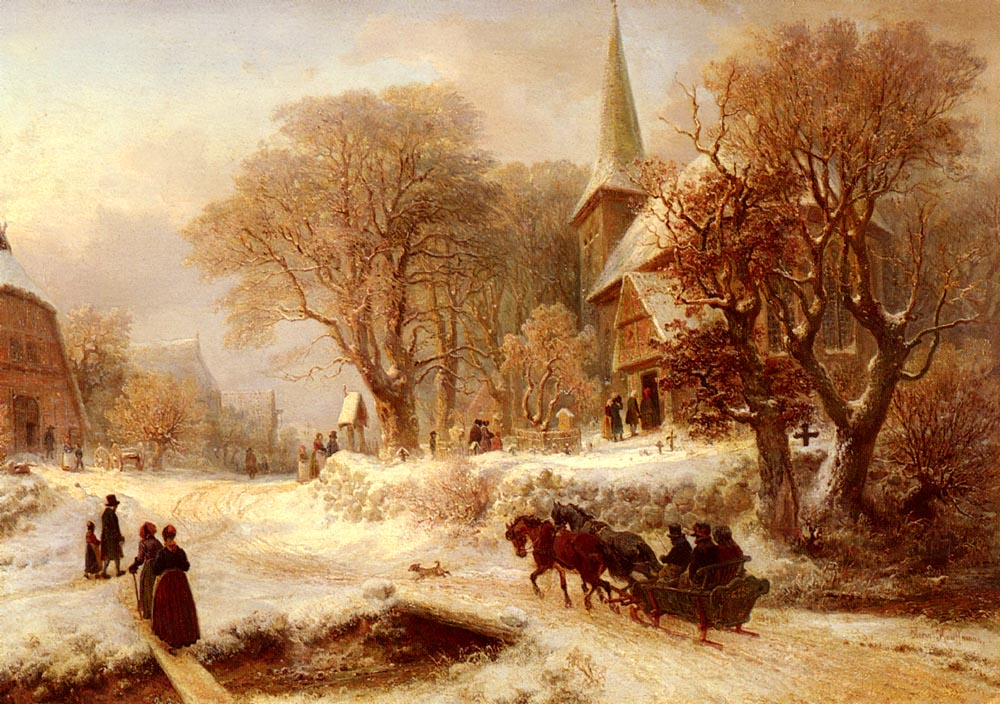
Die Hammer Kirche—a church in Hamm, Hamburg

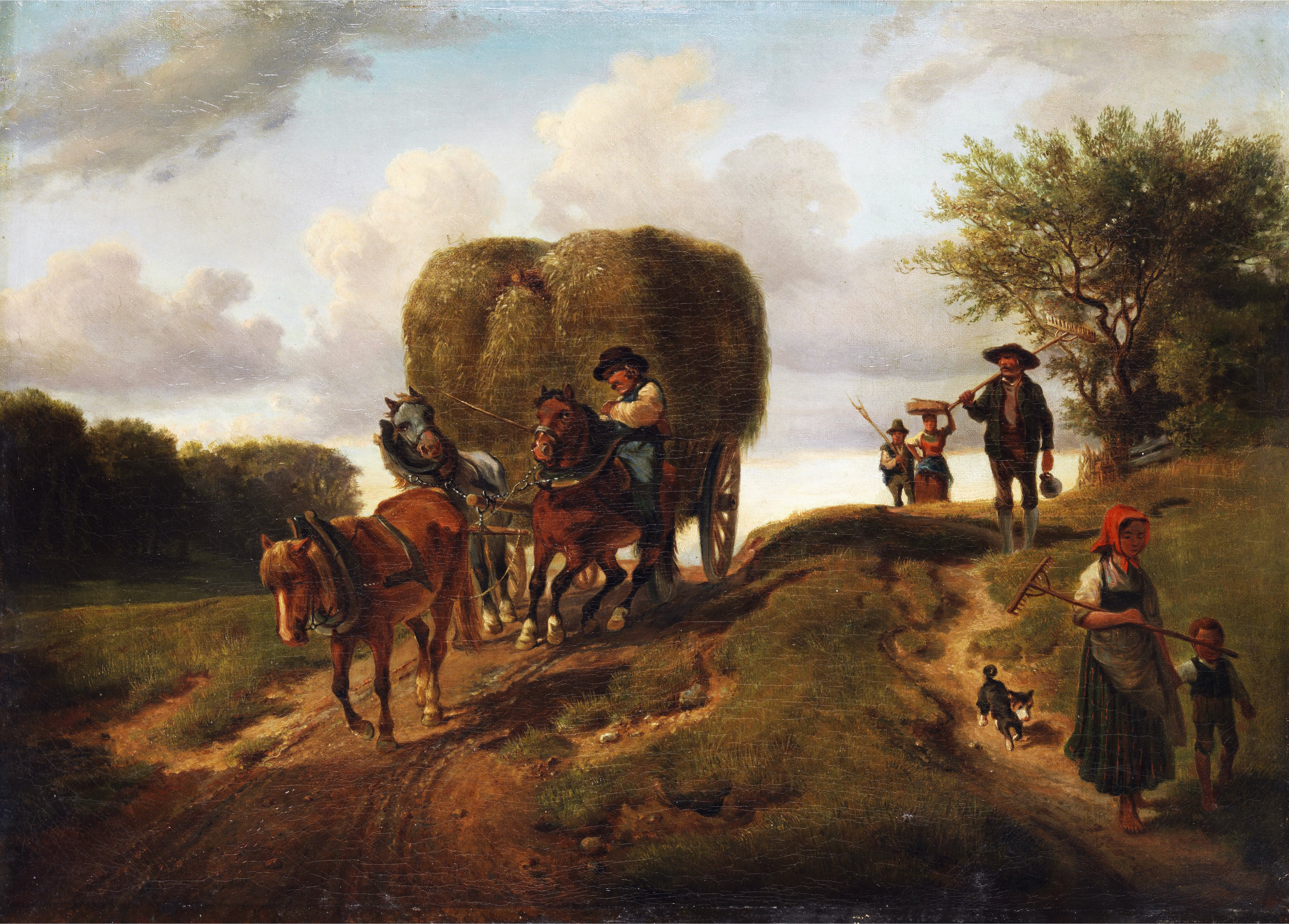
The Haywagon

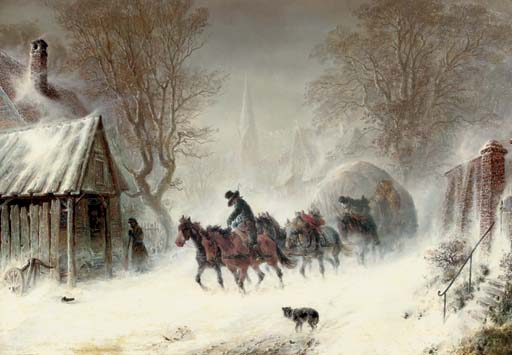
Enduring the Snowstorm

== Literatur ==
- Brigitte Lohkamp (1977). "Kauffmann, Hermann". Neue Deutsche Biographie (in German). Vol. 11. Berlin: Duncker & Humblot. pp. 343–344. (full text online).
- Emil Benezé. (1906). "Kauffmann, Hermann" . Allgemeine Deutsche Biographie (in German). Vol. 51. Leipzig: Duncker & Humblot. pp. 73–75.
- Bärbel Hedinger: Hermann Kauffmann 1808-1899 - Bilder aus Norddeutschland. Ausstellungskatalog, Altonaer Museum, Norddeutsches Landesmuseum, 1989, ISBN 3-927637-02-5
