= Johann Georg Haeselich =

German painter

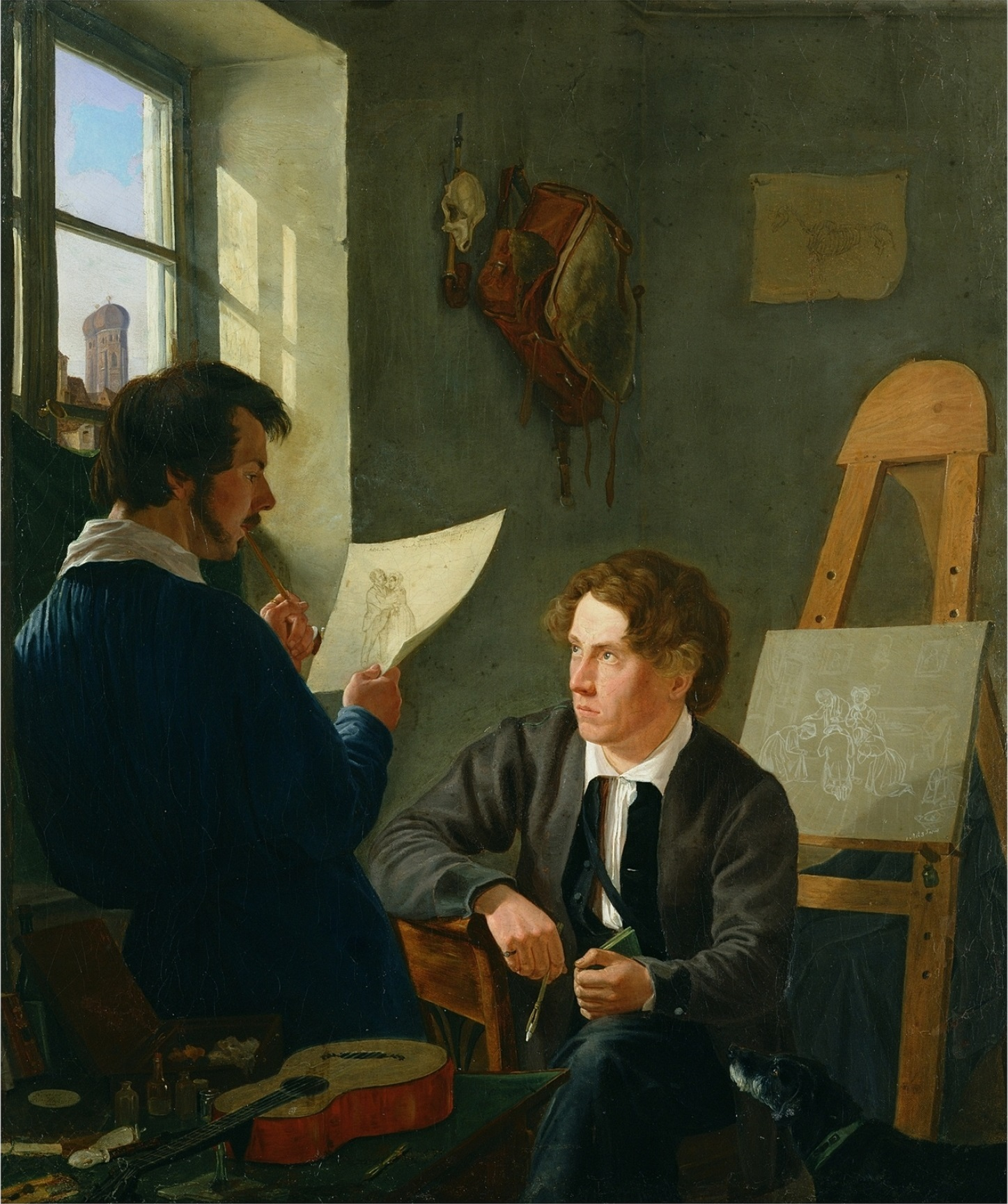
Johann Georg Haeselich (standing) and Hermann Kauffmann in Kauffmann's Atelier in München (1830)

Johann Georg Haeselich (also Haselick; 30 August 1806 – 6 December 1894) was a German genre painter and lithographer.

== Education ==
Haeselich studied the painting of nature with Gerdt Hardorff, who also taught Hermann Kauffmann in Naturstudien, and then continued his studies at the academies in Berlin and Dresden. In 1828 he went to Munich and entered the Academy of Fine Arts as a genre painter. He stayed in Munich until 1836 and was a member of the Hamburg art colony run by Andreas Borum. Journeying into the Bavarian mountains as well as to Tirol and Innsbruck he found the inspiration for the paintings that later made him famous. After returning to Hamburg he devoted himself to painting landscapes of the surrounding area, especially Holstein.

He was a member of the Hamburg art society, and is depicted in the 1840 painting Künstler-Vereinsbild by Günther Gensler.

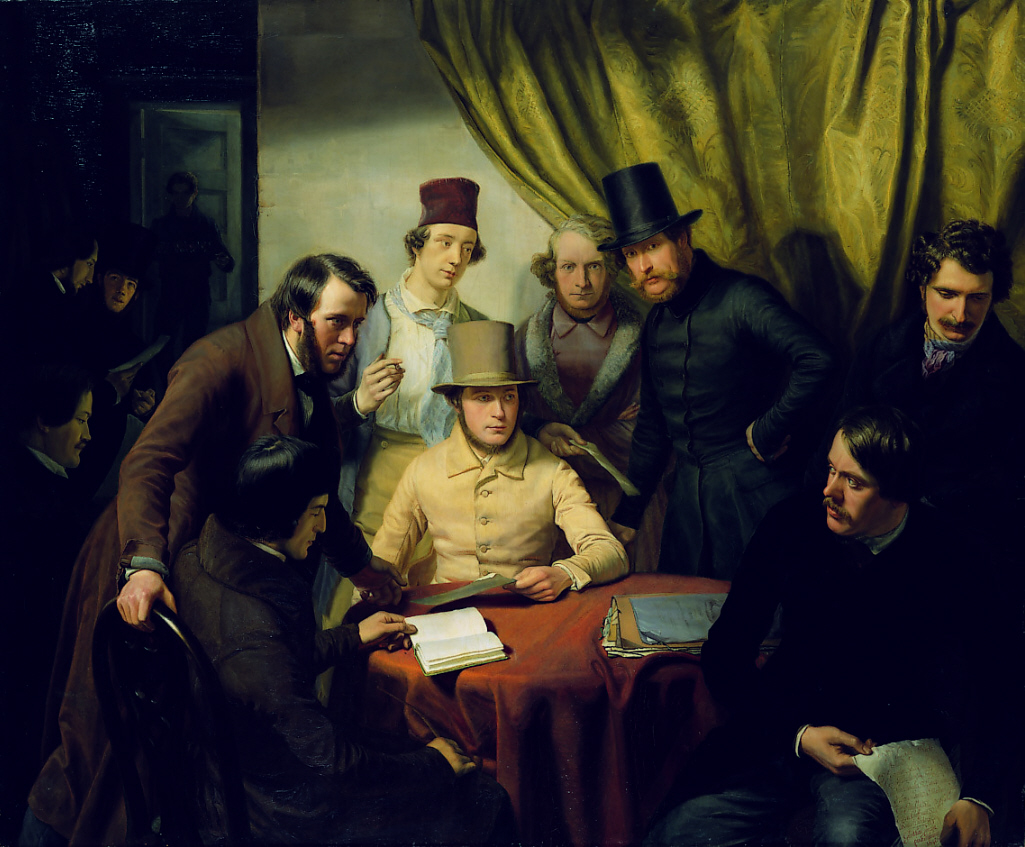
Künstler-Vereinsbild by Günther Gensler depicts Johann Georg Haeselich, standing, wearing a fez.

== Notable works ==
- 1841: Gut Grabau
- 1845: In der Heide, oil painting, 31 x 37 cm, Hamburger Kunsthalle, Inv. Nr. 3191
- 1847: Holsteinischer See, Mondschein
- ca. 1850: Weites Alpental, oil painting, 41.5 x 58 cm
- 1853: Bauernhof am See, 41 x 58.5 cm
- Am Alsterlauf ausgeführt, oil painting, 42 x 43 cm
- Holsteinische Landschaft, 40.5 x 57.5 cm

== Paintings ==
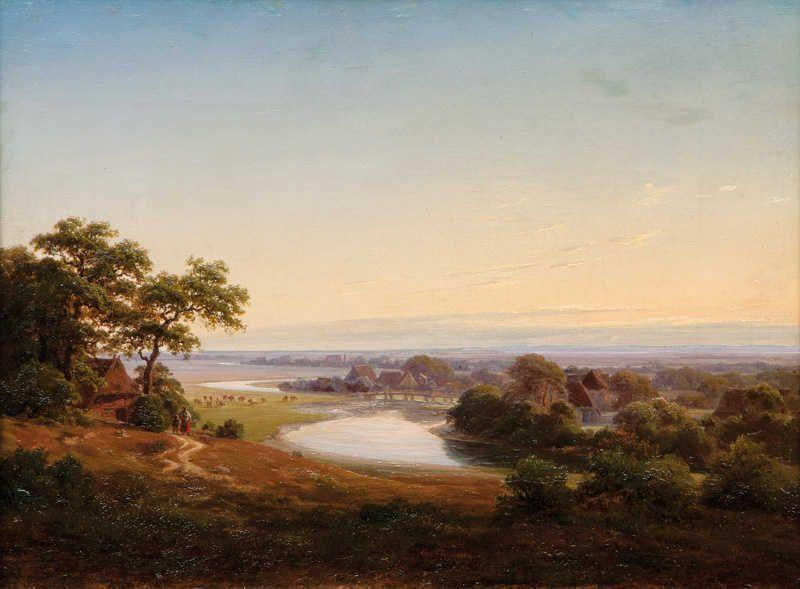
Abendstimmung am Fluss

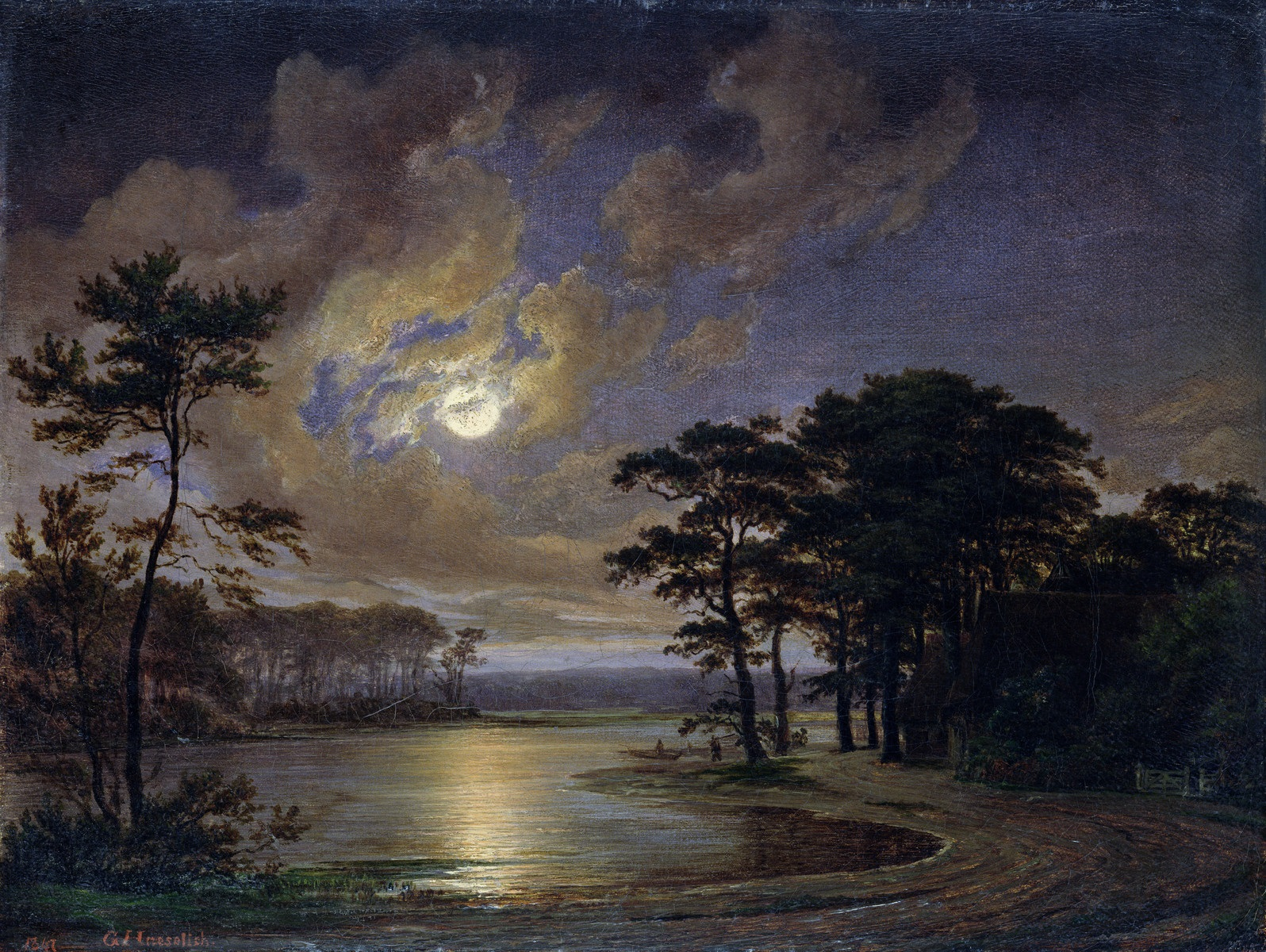
Holsteinischer See, Mondschein

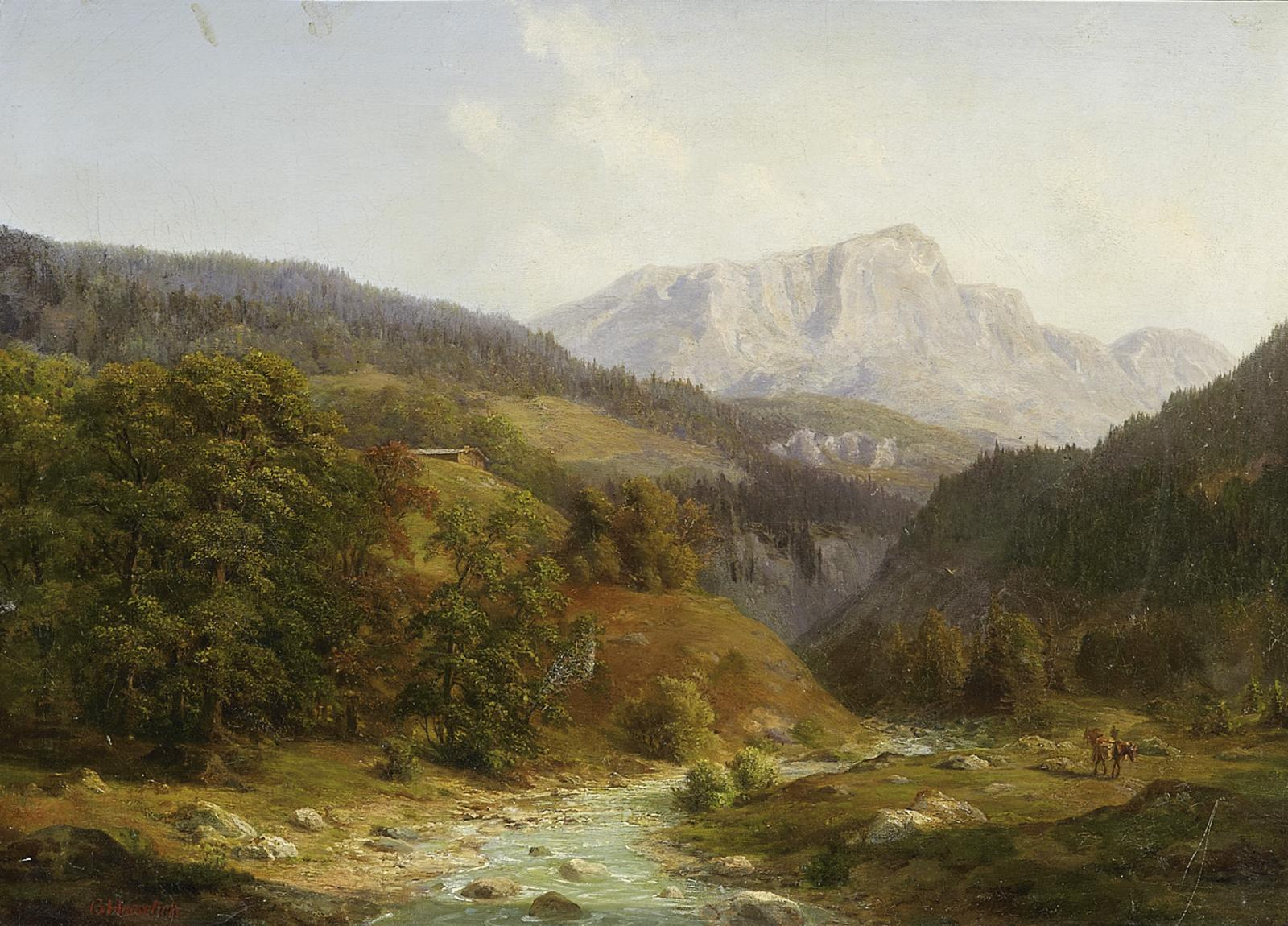
Alpenpanorama

== Auctions ==
- 1926: Pferd. Blei (15 cm x 17 cm) von 1830, Aufruf durch Rudolph Lepke's Kunst-Auctions-Haus in Berlin 16 November 1926
- 1926: Zaunstudie. Feder, von 1829, zusammen 4 Blätter, Aufruf durch Rudolph Lepke's Kunst-Auctions-Haus in Berlin 16 November 1926

== Exhibitions ==
- 1909: Ausstellung des Hamburger Künstlervereins mit seinen Werken
