= Theodor Bülau =

German architect

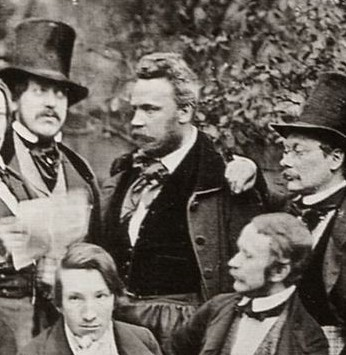
Theodor Bülau (center) at a meeting of the Hamburger Kunstlerverein (1843) Others, left to right: Martin Gensler, Johann Ludwig Westermann (painter), Jacob Gensler, and "Kollmann" (?, architect)

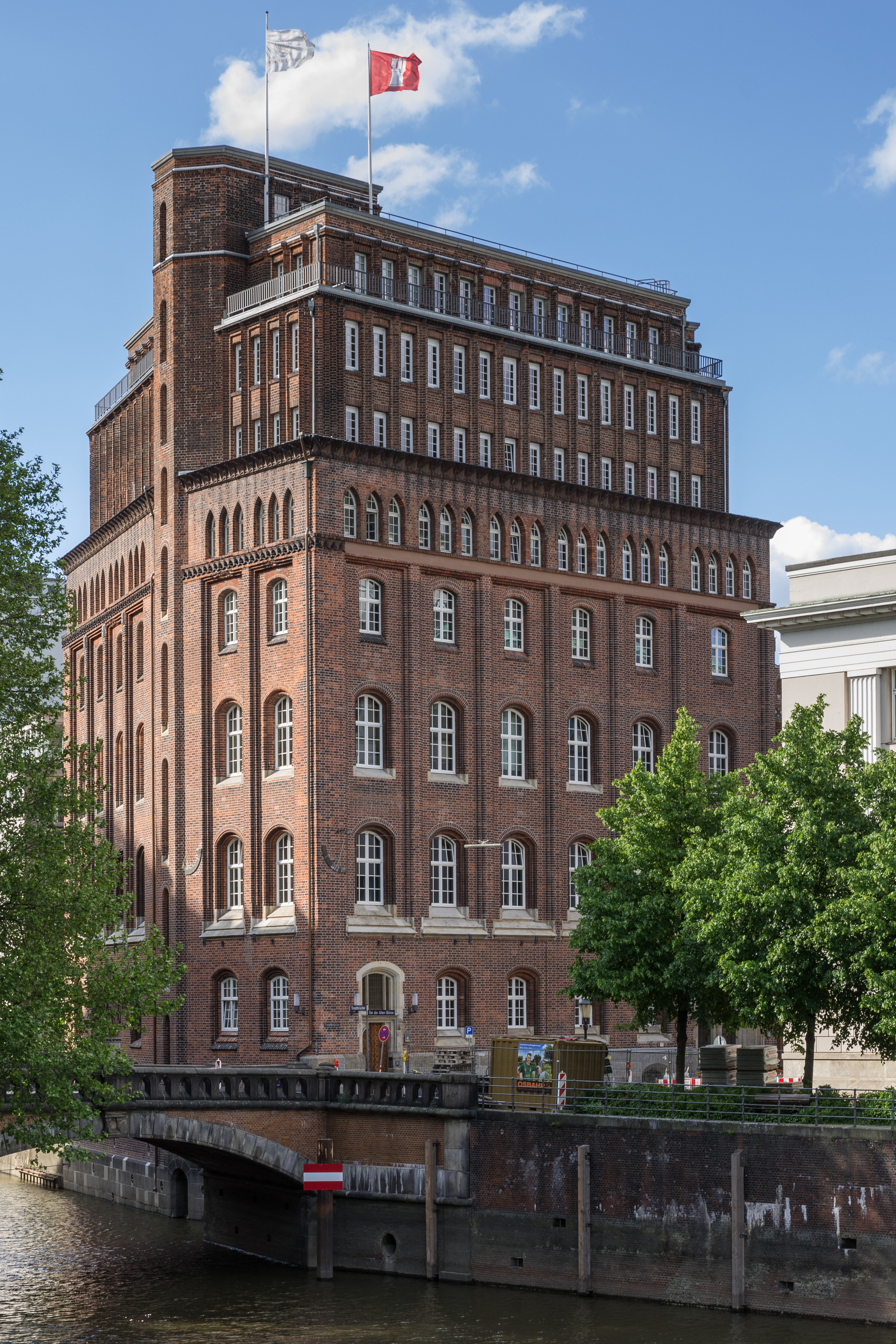
Headquarters of the Patriotische Gesellschaft

Theodor Bülau (1 December 1800, Hamburg – 7 June 1861, Hamburg) was a German architect.

== Life and work ==
His father was an insurance broker, originally from Zerbst. His first drawing lessons came from Gerdt Hardorff. In 1820, he enrolled at the Academy of Fine Arts, Munich, where he studied history painting. This was followed by study trips through Southern Germany, and a visit to Regensburg in 1824. While there, he received a commission from Karl Alexander, 5th Prince of Thurn and Taxis, to restore the frescoes in the dome of Neresheim Abbey; a project that occupied him until 1828. After that, he concentrated entirely on architecture.

In the 1830s, he worked with an architect named Justus Popp. They created a self-published work, issued in several volumes, entitled Die Architectur des Mittelalters in Regensburg (1834–1837), in which he described Gothic architecture as Germany's national art. From 1837 to 1842, he was involved in remodeling and erecting buildings at the salt works near Sarralbe, most of which were in Classical style.

He returned home in 1842, following the Great Fire, hoping to obtain work on the reconstruction, and publishing several newspaper articles on how he felt it should proceed. He strongly opposed a plan by William Lindley, to rebuild the city on a grid, saying it would destroy the city's character. His arguments were eloquent, but he failed to propose a cohesive counter-plan. He joined with Alexis de Chateauneuf in calling for brick buildings to be given preference over plastered ones, as being in line with "republican tradition". Later, he became a member of a commission responsible for rehabilitating St. Nicholas Church.

He was a member of the Hamburger Künstlerverein von 1832, and took part in numerous design competitions, including those for the Hamburg City Hall and the Hamburg Orphanage. After 1845, he gave drawing lessons at the Johanneum and, after 1847, at the Patriotische Gesellschaft, in a building he designed. As the number of commissions he received slowly decreased, he came to rely more on teaching for his income. In 1849, he began to show signs of an eye disease that would eventually leave him almost totally blind.

After his death, most of his estate papers passed into the hands of the Architekten- und Ingenieurverein Hamburg, and were destroyed in World War II, during Operation Gomorrah. Some may still be found in the collection of the Museum für Kunst und Gewerbe Hamburg.
