= Borum (surname) =

Borum is a surname. Notable people with the surname include:

- Andreas Borum (1799–1853), German painter and lithographer
- John R. Borum (1907–1943), United States Naval Reserve lieutenant
- Poul Borum (1934–1996), Danish writer, poet and critic
- Fred S. "Fritz" Borum (b. 1978), Major general of the United States Air Force
- Randy Borum, American professor of Intelligence Studies
