= Hugo Kauffmann =

German painter

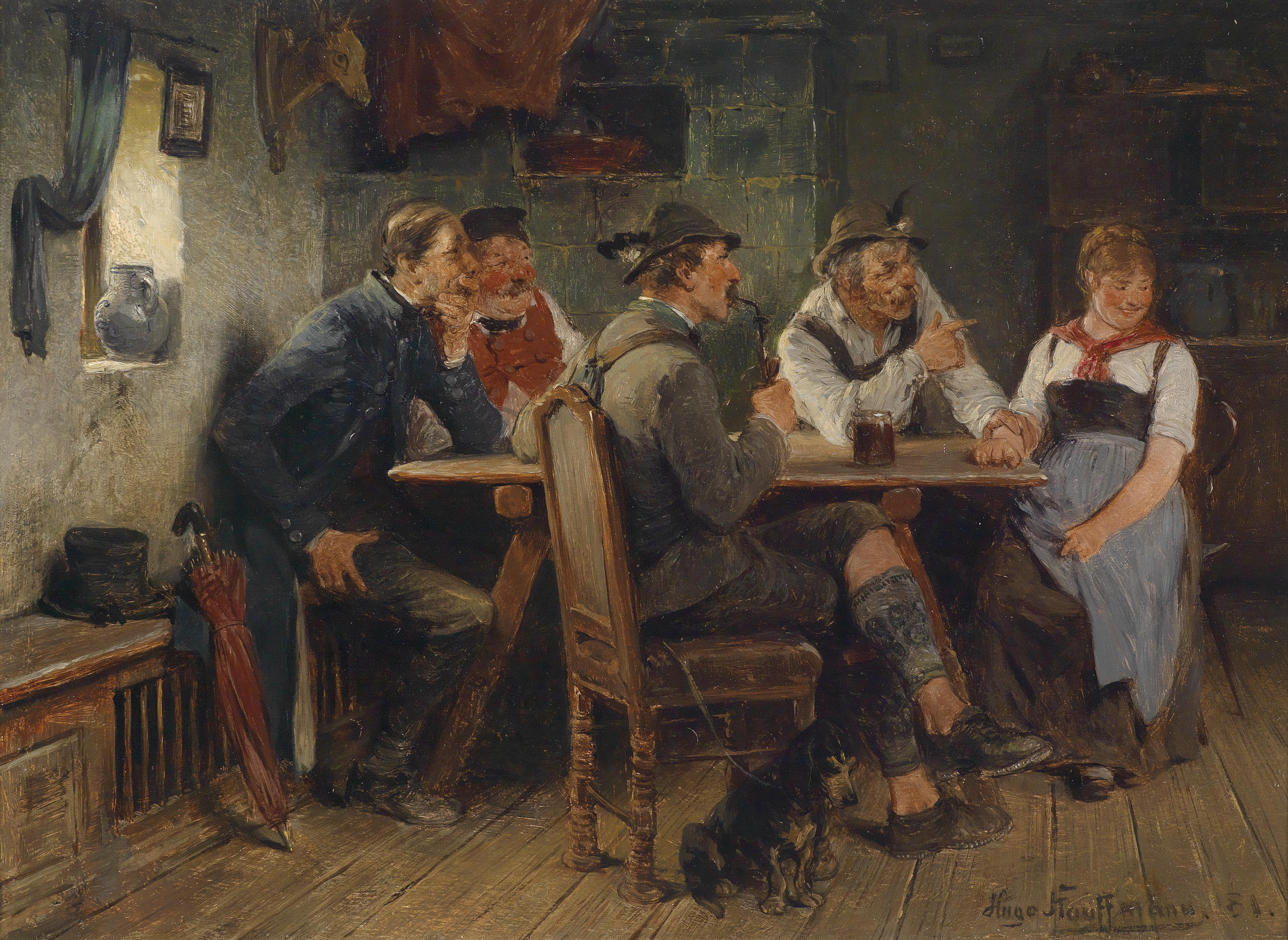
Hugo Kauffmann, Auf dem Prüfstand, 1881

Hugo Wilhelm Kauffmann (7 August 1844 – 30 December 1915) was a German painter, the son of Hermann Kauffmann.

Kauffmann was born in Hamburg. In 1861 he went to Frankfurt and worked there under Jakob Becker, Eduard Jakob von Steinle and Johann Nepomuk Zwerger. From 1863 until 1871 he lived in Kronberg in the Taunus. During this time he spent one winter in Hamburg and a five-month period in Düsseldorf; afterwards he spent 1½ years in Paris, until 1870 when the war drove him out. He lived until 1871 in Munich.

Kauffmann is known mainly for genre paintings, often set in taverns. His paintings are usually small in scale and painted on wood. His work is representative of the Munich School.

He died in Prien at the Chiemsee in 1915.

== Gallery ==
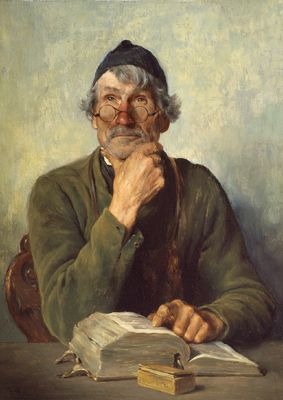
Lesender Alter, 1879

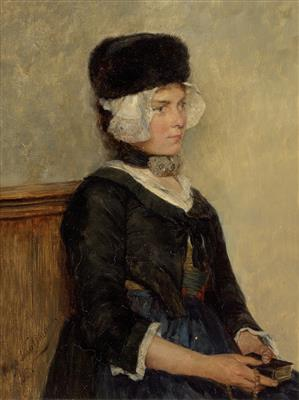
Young Girl with prayer book, 1888

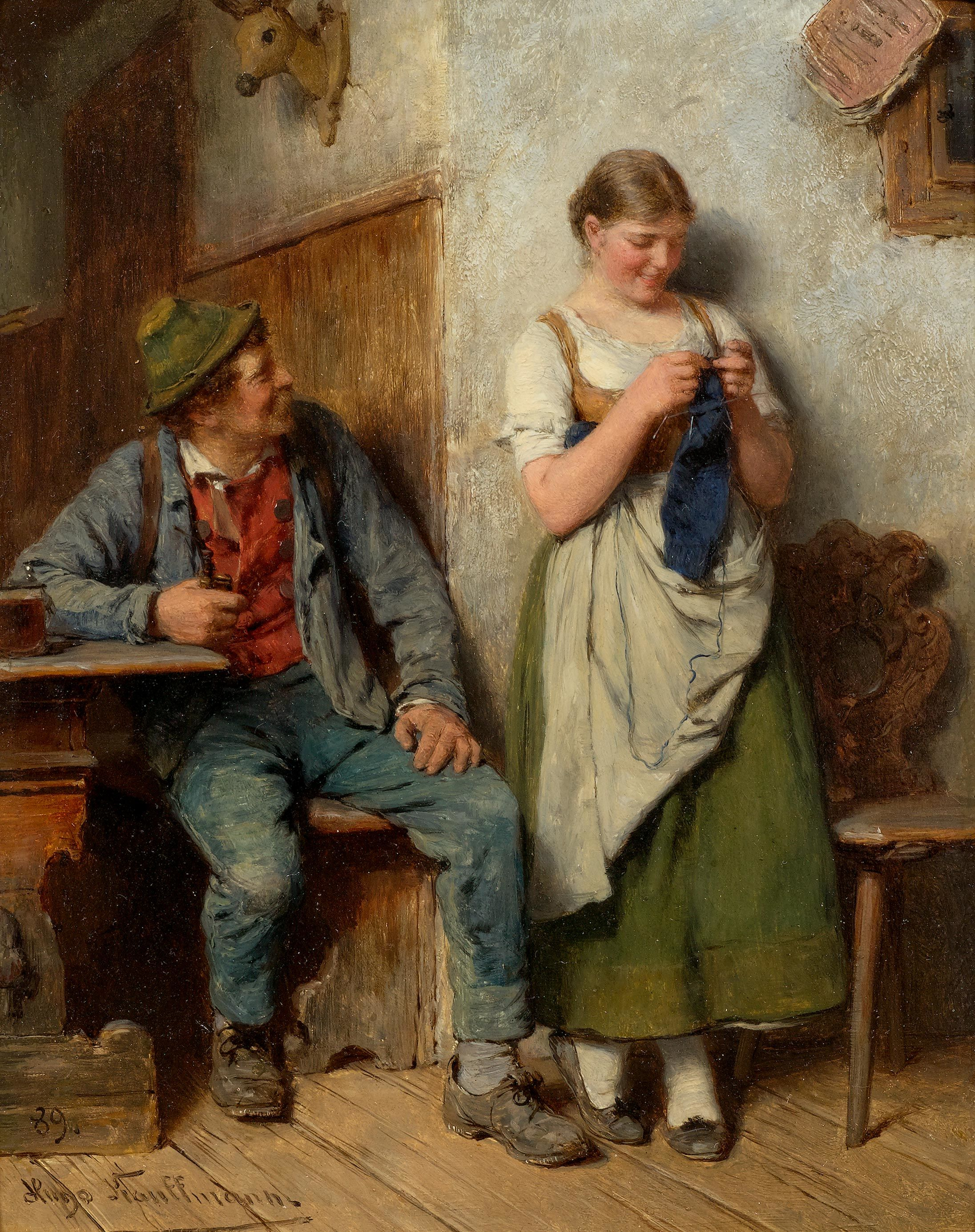
Interior with a forester's assistant and a girl knitting, 1889

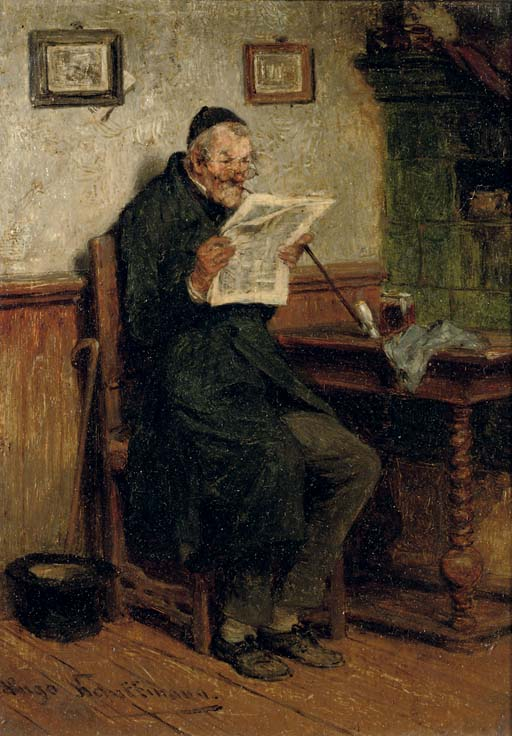
The daily news
