= Andreas Borum =

German painter

Andreas Borum (1799 – 29 April 1853) was a German painter and lithographer who also worked in stone, and a collector.

== Birth and training ==
Borum ws born in Hamburg. He worked in Leipzig as a housepainter before receiving an education at the Academy of Fine Arts, Munich.

== Career ==
From 1829 to 1835 he led the "Hamburg Art Colony" in Munich, a group which included artists such as Jakob Gensler, Georg Haeselich, Marcus Haeselich, Franz Heesche, Victor Emil Janssen, Hermann Kauffmann, Johann Carl Koch, Joh. Ludwig Westermann, Wilhelm Friedrich Wulff and Wassermann.

From 1835 to 1839 he was employed together with D. Leon, Eduard Gerhardt and Bonaventura Weiß (born 1812) at the "lithographic-artistic" institute of the Kehr brothers, sometimes called Kehr & Niessen, which was founded in Cologne by the lithographer Carl Kehr and his brother Johann Philipp Kehr (born 1800 in Bad Kreuznach).

== Death ==
Borum died in 1853 in Munich.

== Notable works ==
- um 1824: Lithographie: Trarbach mit der Ruine Gräfenburg an der Mosel nach einem Gemälde von Domenico Quaglio bei J. Lacroix
- 1827: architektonische Verzierungen im Verlag von Hermann und Barth in München die 1830 an der Herausgabe Malerische Topographie des Königreichs Bayern. beteiligt waren.
- 1828: das Coliseum nach einem Gemälde von Rottmann als 39,2 cm x 55 cm bei Joseph Lacroix gedruckte Lithographie und Jahresgabe des Kunstverein München
- 1828: der Dom zu Mailand nach einem Gemälde von Migliara, (Lithographie)
- 1828: Neuötting nach einem Gemälde von Domenico Quaglio, (Lithographie)
- 1828: Ein Seestück nach einem Gemälde Van de Velde, (Lithographie)
- um 1829: Ueberlingen am Bodensee. Blick vom Westen zum Münster, umgeben von zahlreichen Fachwerkhäusern mit Wäscherinnen an einem Bach und Brunnen nach einem Gemälde von Domenico Quaglio bei Ebner in Augsburg
- 1834: Gemeinsam mit A. Grandmayer zu: Das Nahe Thal: von dem Ursprung der Nahe bis zur Mündung in den Rhein; nach der Natur von J. C. Scheuren aufgenommen.
- um 1835: Die Ruine der Ebernburg bei Kreuznach .
- um 1839: Die Heimkehr der Hirten nach Boud und Boudewins
- um 1840: gemeinsam mit Albert Emil Kirchner: Die Ludwigsstrasse in München
- Der Klosterhof im Schnee after Carl Friedrich Lessing
- Niederländische Landschaft after Hobbe
- Der Rheingrafenstein von der Westseite nach Hobbe

== Exhibitions ==
1839: Ausstellung von Produkten des Kunst- und Gewerbefleißes in Köln mit der “Die Heimkehr der Hirten”, Allgemeines Organ für Handel und Gewerbe und damit verwandte Gegenstände. Band 4. Wöchentliches Beiblatt zum Allgemeinen Organ, enthaltend die Verhandlungen und Mittheilungen des Gewerbe-Vereins zu Köln.
