= Jacob Gensler =

German painter (1808–1845)

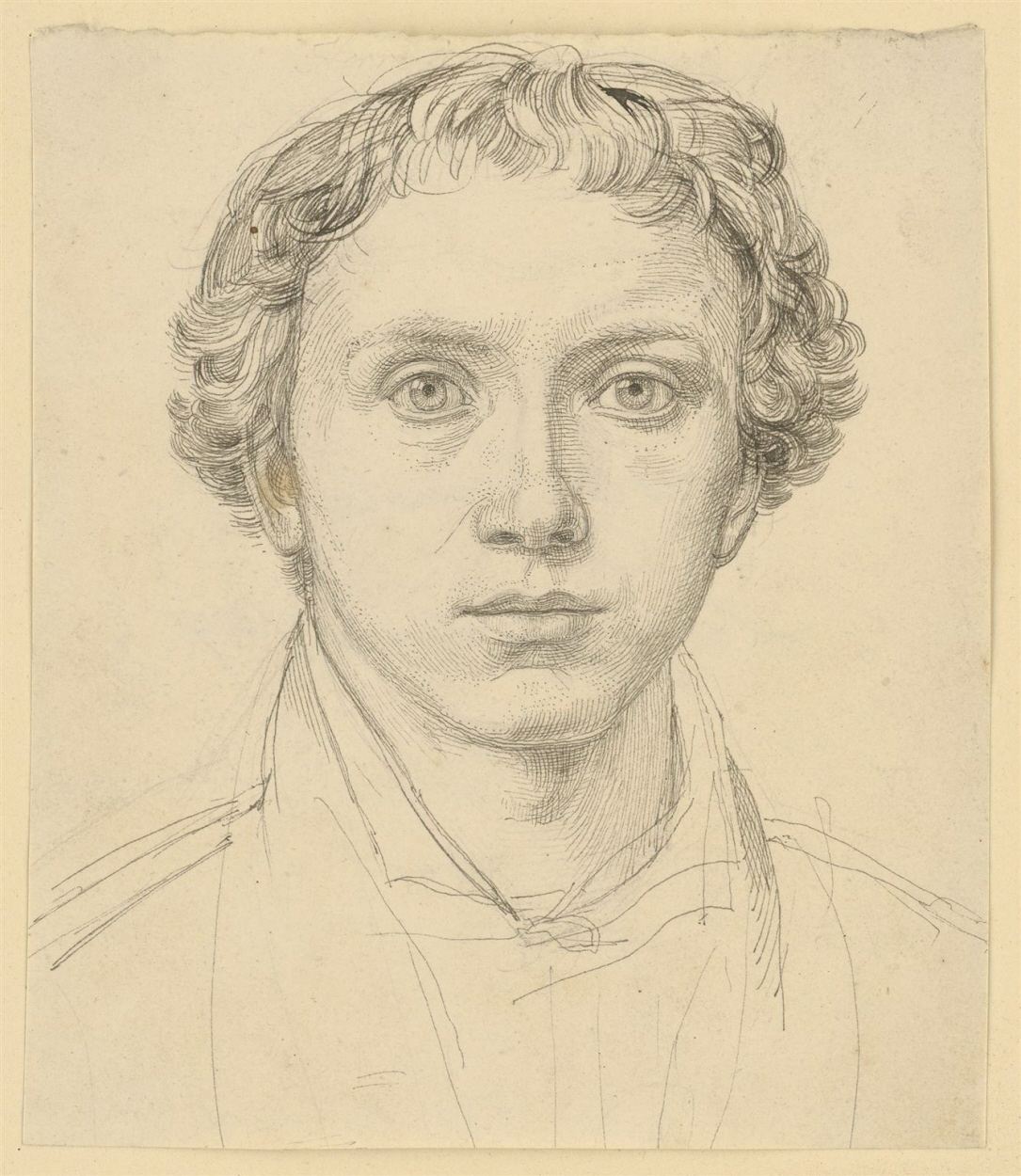
- Born: 21 January 1808; Hamburg
- Died: 26 January 1845
- Relatives: Martin Gensler

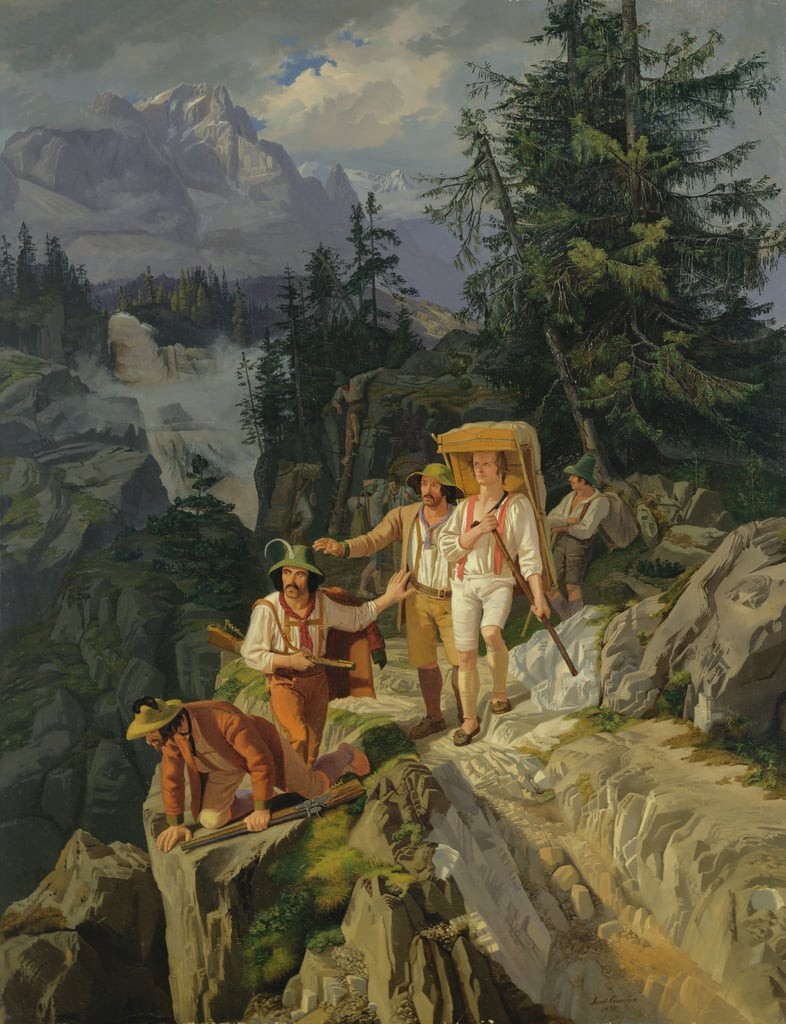
Tirolese Smugglers

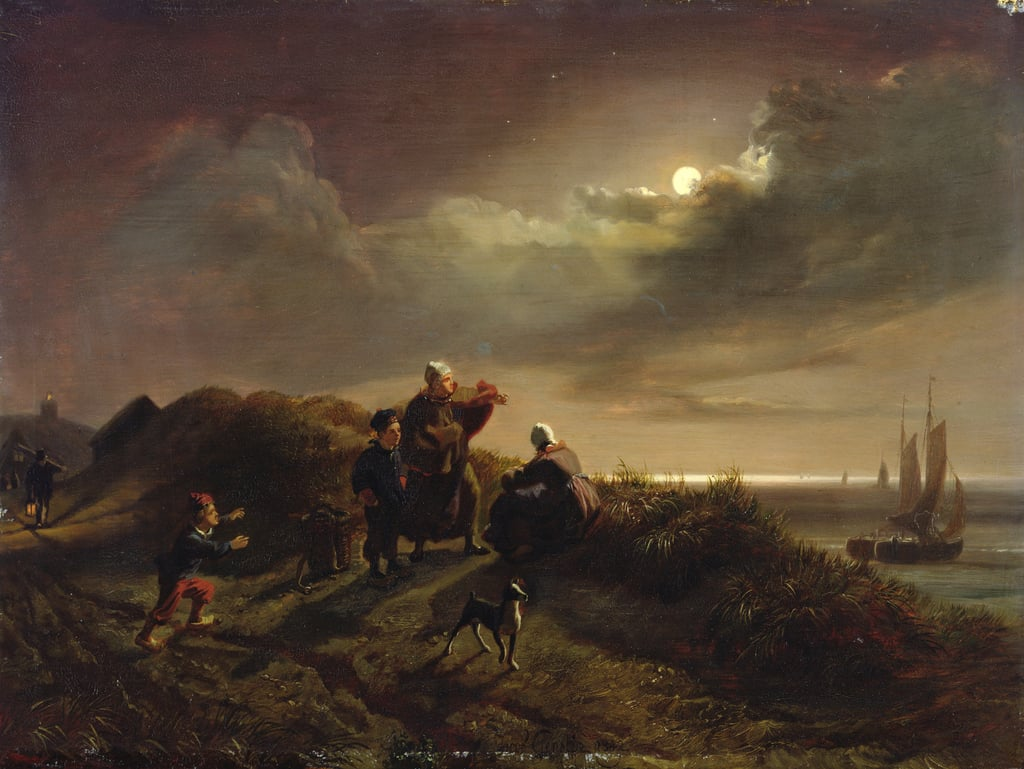
On the Coast Near Scheveningen

Johann Jacob Gensler (21 January 1808 – 26 January 1845) was a German etcher and painter specializing in genre scenes and landscapes.

== Life and work ==
He was born in Hamburg. His father was a gold plater. He received his first drawing lessons from his older brother, Günther, as did his younger brother, Martin. This was followed by studies with Wilhelm Tischbein in Eutin, then with Gerdt Hardorff and Siegfried Bendixen in Hamburg. From 1828 to 1831, he attended the Academy of Fine Arts, Munich. In 1832, he was one of the founding members of the Hamburger Künstlerverein.

His etchings of sailors, and illustrations for the folk ballad "Der Edelknabe und die Müllerin" (The Noble Boy and the Miller, from Lieder und Bilder, 1844) were among his most popular. After the completion of reconstruction, following the Great Fire of Hamburg, he designed the "certificates of thanks" that were presented to Prussia, Sachsen-Meiningen, Bremen, Nassau, the Netherlands and England; using a Medieval miniature painting technique.

All three Gensler brothers were members of the Hamburger Turnerschaft von 1816. Gensler died in Hamburg in 1845 and was interred in the family grave at Ohlsdorf Cemetery. A street was named after them in Hamburg's Barmbek district.

In 2019, his works were part of a major exhibition: "Hamburger Schule – Das 19. Jahrhundert neu entdeckt", at the Hamburger Kunsthalle.

== Sources ==
- Gerhard Ahrens: "Gensler, Jacob", In: Franklin Kopitzsch, Dirk Brietzke (Eds.): Hamburgische Biografie, Vol.1. Christians, Hamburg 2001, ISBN 3-7672-1364-8 pg.103
- Fritz Bürger: Die Gensler, drei Hamburger Malerbrüder des 19. Jahrhunderts, Heitz, Straßburg 1888 (Online)
- Fritz Bürger: Studien zur deutschen Kunstgeschichte: "Die Genseler, drei Hamburger Malerbrüder des 19. Jahrhunderts", 1916
- Emil Benezé (1904). "Gensler, Günther" . Allgemeine Deutsche Biographie (in German). Vol. 49. Leipzig: Duncker & Humblot. pp. 284–285. (Article on all three brothers)
- Silke Reuther: Johann Jacob Gensler: Ein Maler aus Hamburg (1808-1845), Berlin 1998. ISBN 978-3-8258-3373-2
- Ulrich Schulte-Wülwer: "Johann Heinrich Wilhelm Tischbein und seine Schüler in Eutin", in: Nordelbingen, Vol.81, 2012, pp. 39–71
- Henry A. Smith: "Mit den Augen eines Malers – Eutin und das östliche Holstein in den Briefen des jungen Jacob Gensler". In: Nordelbingen, Vol.84, 2015, pp. 85–130
