= Heinrich Stuhlmann =

German painter

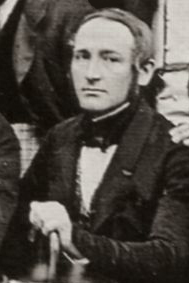
Heinrich Stuhlmann (1843)

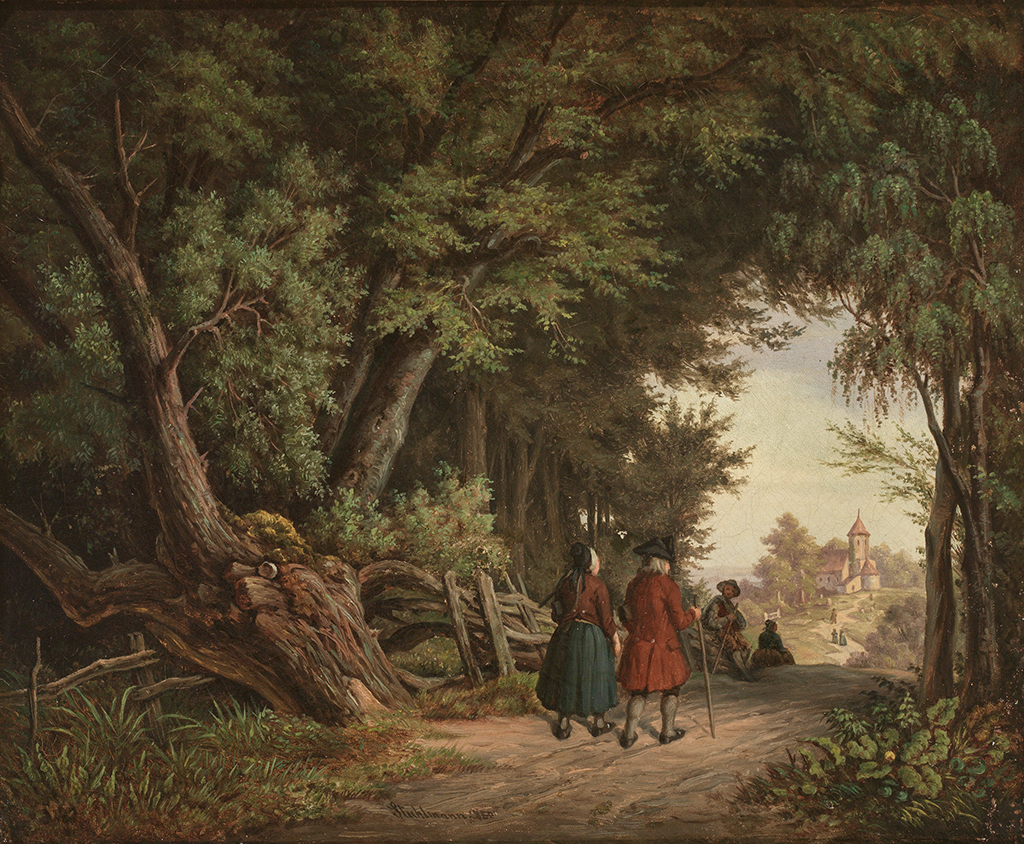
A Romantic Forest Path

Heinrich Stuhlmann (28 December 1803, Hamburg - 23 October 1886, Hamburg) was a German painter, graphic artist and amateur photographer.

== Life and work ==
He was born to Johann Daniel Stuhlmann, an insurance and coffee broker. Following Johann's untimely death in 1814, Heinrich was adopted by his uncle, Matthias Heinrich Stuhlmann (1774–1822), the Pastor of St. Catherine's Church, who helped him complete his education. As he developed a desire to become an artist, he took drawing lessons from Gerdt Hardorff. After serving a commercial apprenticeship, rather than go into business, he attended the Royal Danish Academy of Fine Arts, where he worked in the studios of Christian David Gebauer.

In 1825, he returned to Munich and found a job with the Zeitung für Pferdeliebhaber (Newspaper for Horse Lovers), published by Major Johann Georg Wachenhusen, and made several trips to study horses. For one year, he was employed by Frederick Francis I, Grand Duke of Mecklenburg-Schwerin, and drew horses for the Landgestüt Redefin (Redefin Stud Farm). During this time, he also did interior paintings and landscape studies, and accompanied a nobleman to Berlin to help him acquire art for his private gallery. In 1830, he visited Dresden to study landscape painting with Johan Christian Clausen Dahl.

In 1832, he and fourteen other artists founded what would come to be known as the Hamburger Künstlerverein von 1832. He published several books of etchings in 1838 and 1839; featuring landscapes, interiors, and wild animals. Some of his paintings were lost in the Great Fire of 1842. Following a photo shoot with fellow members of the Künstlerverein, in 1843, he developed an interest in daguerrotypes. Later, from 1863 to 1868, he operated a photography studio.

His works may be seen at the Hamburger Kunsthalle, the Museum für Hamburgische Geschichte, the Altonaer Museum, and the Philadelphia Museum of Art.

== Sources ==
- "Stuhlmann, Heinrich", In: Georg Kaspar Nagler: Neues allgemeines Künstler-Lexicon, Vol.17, Fleischmann, 1847, pg.519 (Online)
- "Stuhlmann, Heinrich", In Verein für Hamburgische Geschichte: Hamburgisches Künstler-Lexikon, Hoffmann und Campe, Hamburg 1854, pg.256 (Online)
- "Heinrich Stuhlmann", In: Andreas Andresen: Die deutschen Maler-Radirer (Peintres-Graveurs) des neunzehnten Jahrhunderts, Vol.3, Verlag von Rudolph Weigel, Leipzig 1869, pp..60–69 (Digitalisat)
- "Stuhlmann, Heinrich",' In: Ernst Rump: Lexikon der bildenden Künstler Hamburgs, Altonas und der näheren Umgebung, Otto Bröcker & Co., Hamburg 1912, pp. 136, 137 (Online)
- "Stuhlmann, Heinrich", In: Berend Harke Feddersen: Schleswig-Holsteinisches Künstler-Lexikon, Nordfriisk Instituut, Bredstedt 1984, ISBN 3-88007-124-1, pp. 169–170
