= Caspar Scheuren =

German painter

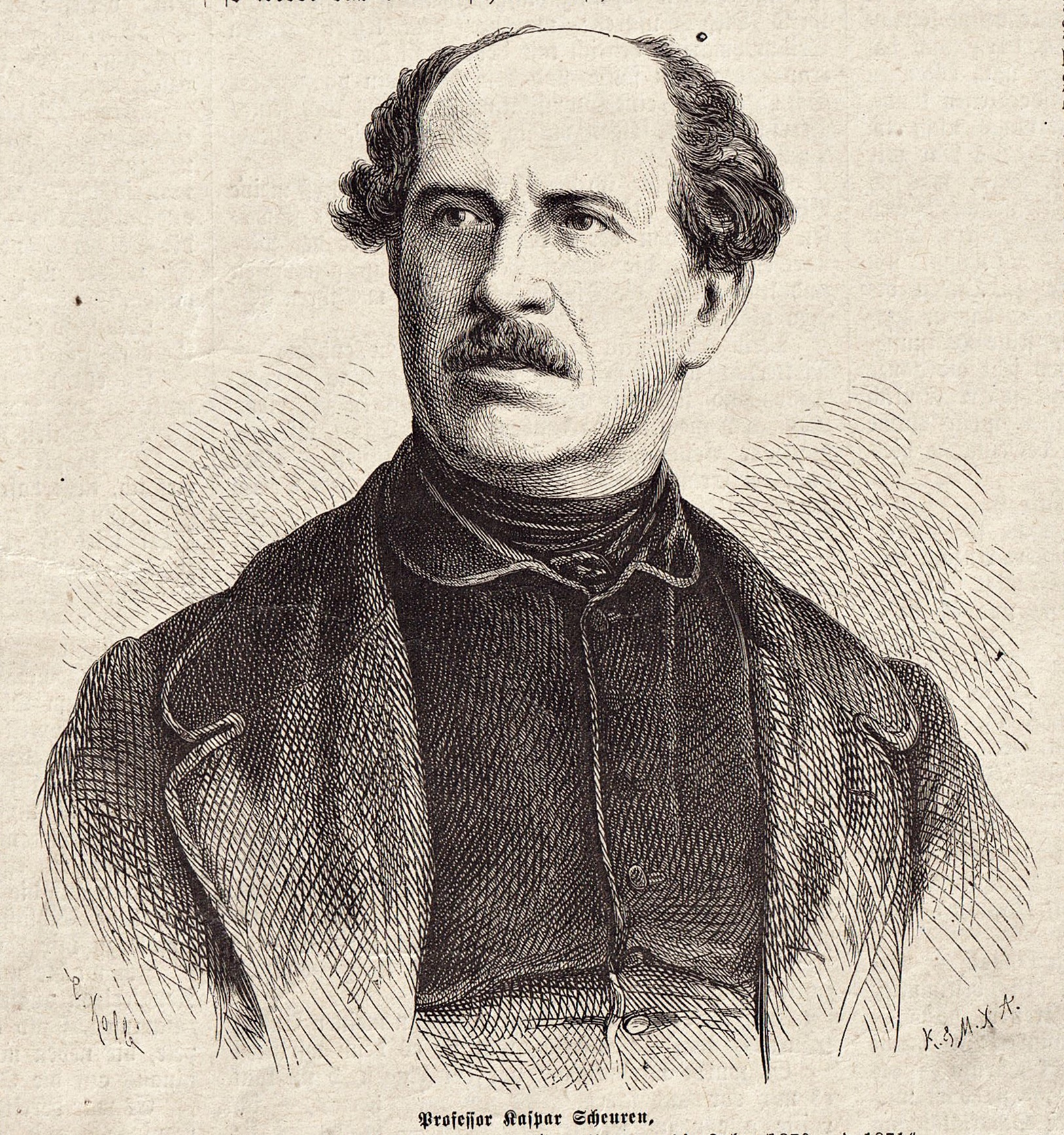
Caspar Scheuren (1873)

Caspar Johann Nepomuk Scheuren (22 August 1810, Aachen - 12 June 1887, Düsseldorf) was a German painter and illustrator.

== Biography ==
His father, Aegidius Scheuren was also an artist. After receiving his initial training at home, he studied landscape painting at the Kunstakademie Düsseldorf, from 1829 to 1835. His Romantic tendencies were encouraged by his admiration for the works of Johann Wilhelm Schirmer and Carl Friedrich Lessing. He was also inspired by the writings of Sir Walter Scott.

By the end of the 1830s, he had already begun to move away from traditional landscape painting, to develop an allegorical style, in which landscapes, figures (staffage) and ornamentation are combined in imaginative ways. Most of his works came to involve motifs from the stories and legends of the Rhine region; a genre which was known as Rhine romanticism.

From 1839, he lived in Düsseldorf, and came to be associated with the Düsseldorf School of painting. He was appointed a Professor at the Academy in 1855.

He created over 300 oil paintings, 600 watercolors, and 400 prints. His large album, dedicated to Schloss Stolzenfels, has been digitalized by the Rheinische Landesbibliothek Koblenz. His works may also be seen at the National Gallery (Berlin), and the Wallraf–Richartz Museum in Cologne.

In 1890, the Aachener Geschichtsverein (historical society) placed a commemorative plaque at his birthplace.

== Selected paintings ==
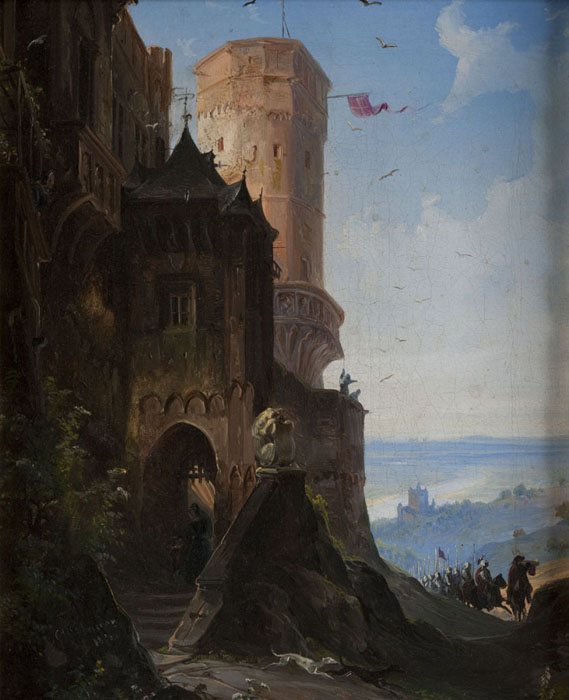
Castle on the Rhine

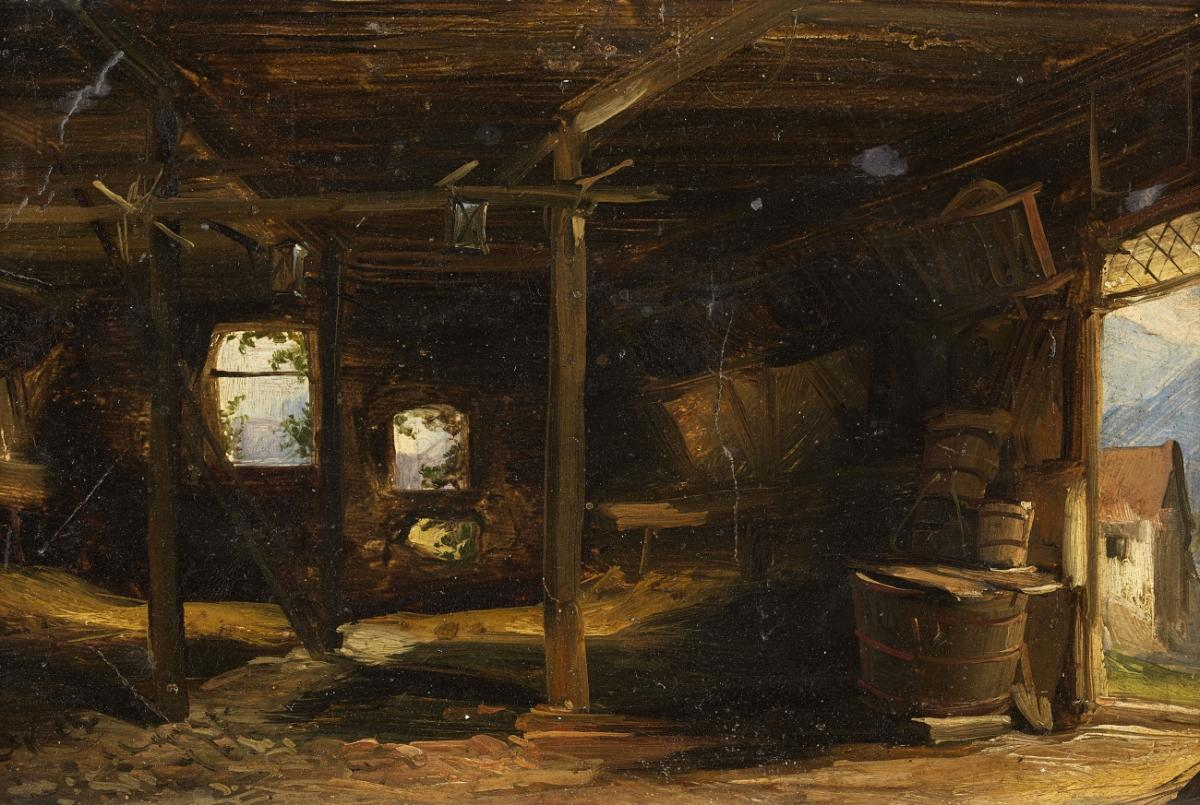
Interior of a Stable

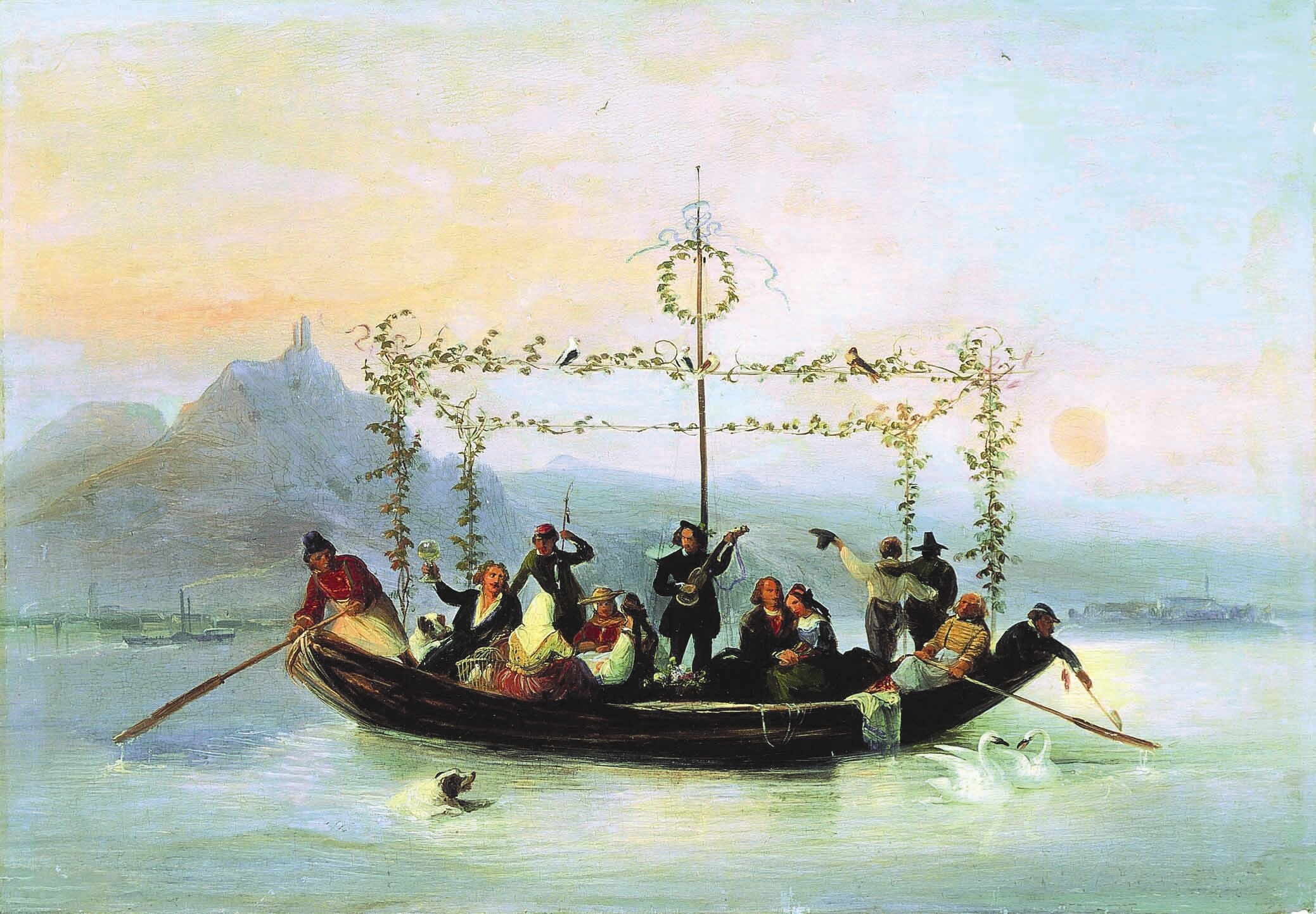
A Merry Journey on the Rhine

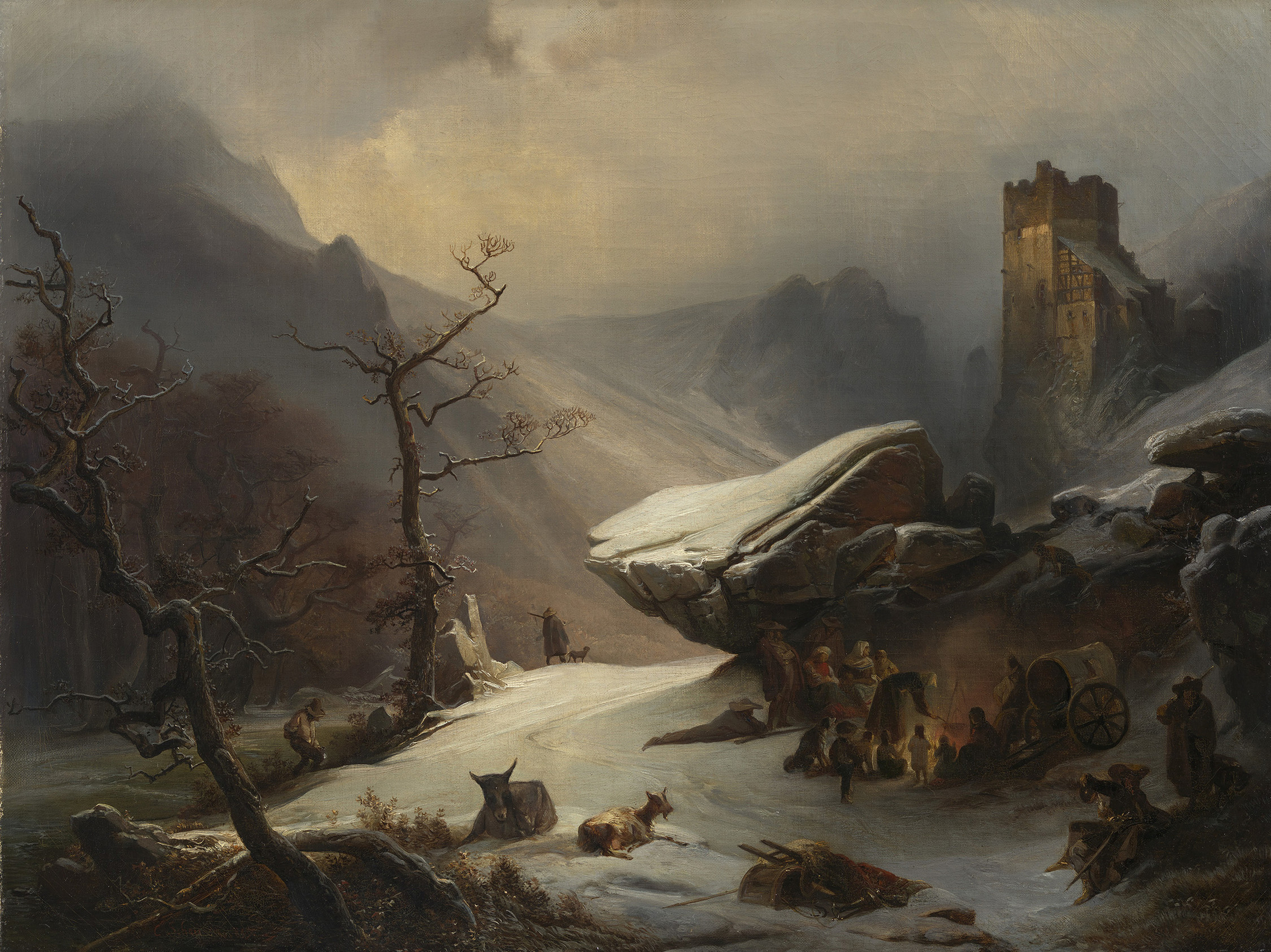
A Winter Scene

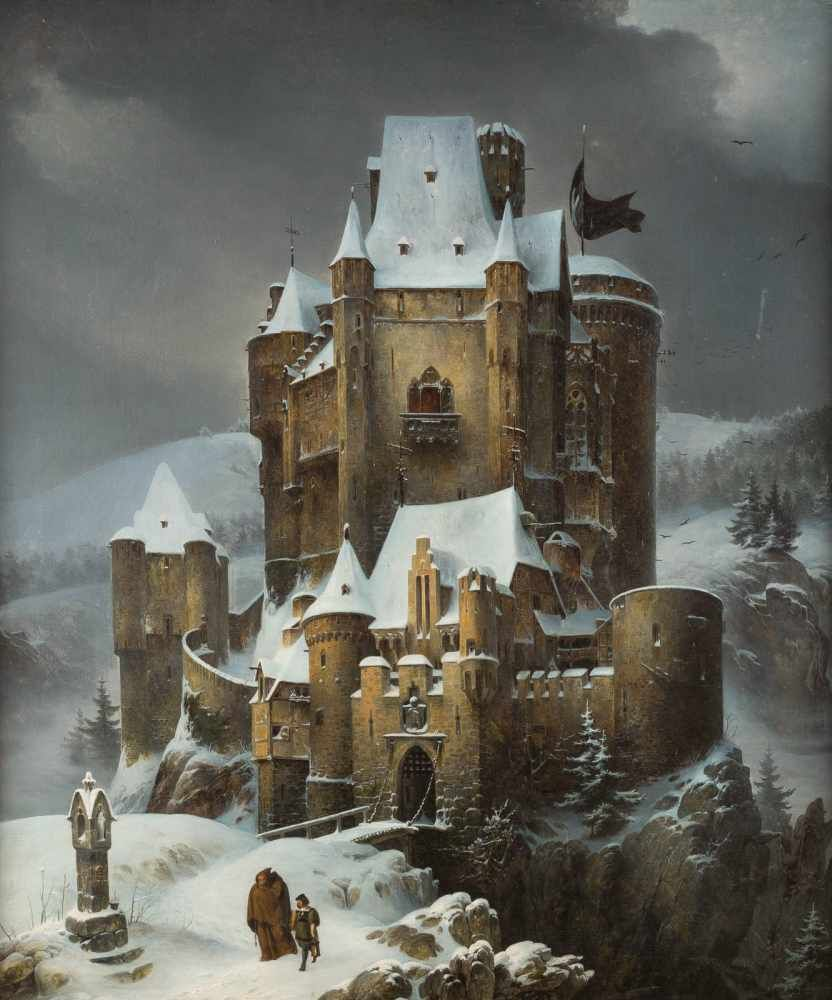
A Knight's Castle
in the Snow

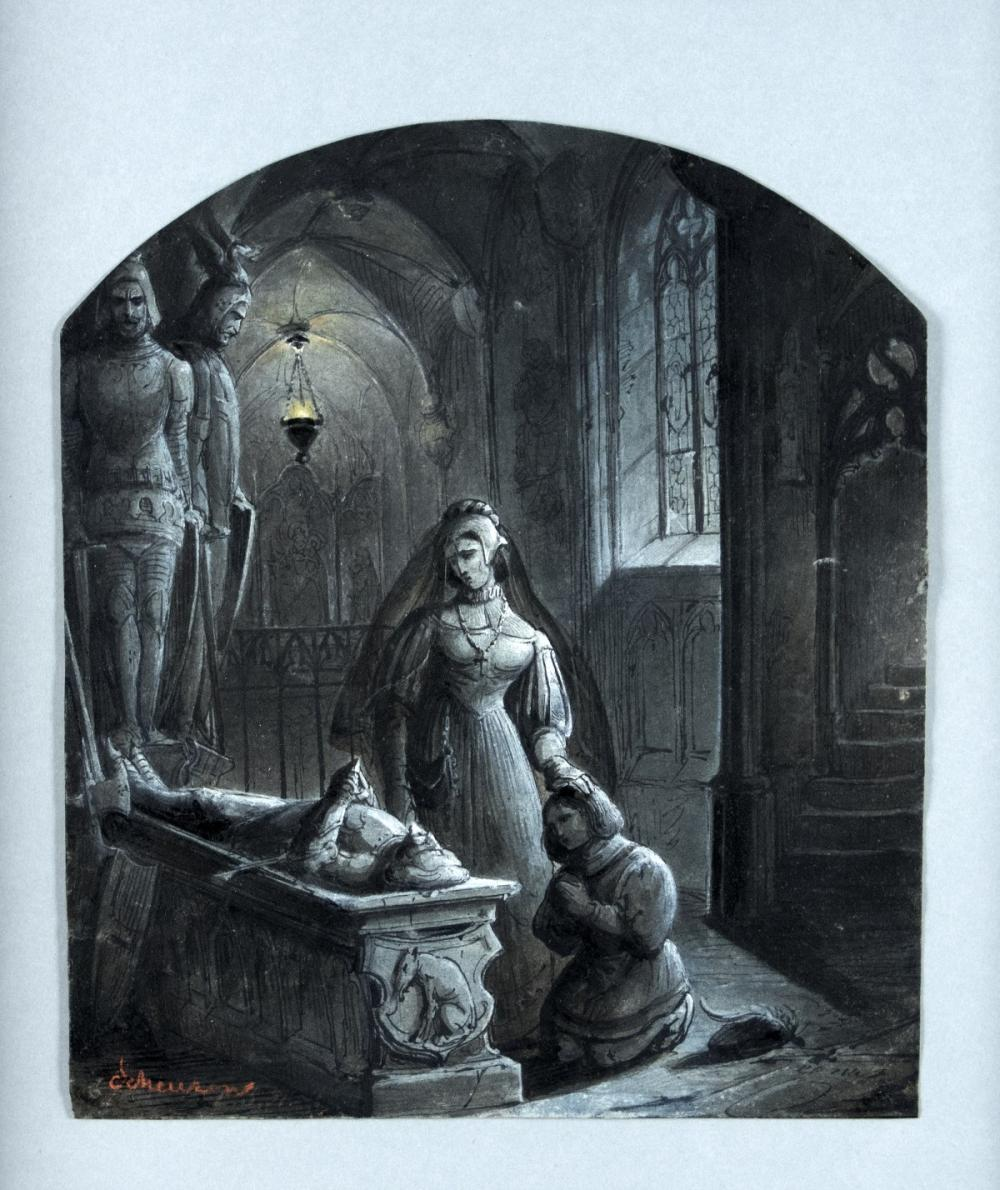
Scheuren At Night in the Chapel

== Sources ==
- Max Georg Zimmermann (1890). "Scheuren, Johann Kaspar Nepomuk" . Allgemeine Deutsche Biographie (in German). Vol. 31. Leipzig: Duncker & Humblot. pp. 143–144.
- Wolfgang Vomm: Caspar Scheurens fragmentarische Autobiographie im Cincinnati Art Museum, Ohio. In: Wallraf-Richartz Yearbook #65 (2004).
- Johannes Fey: "Zur Geschichte Aachener Maler des 19. Jahrhunderts", In: Aus Aachens Vorzeit. Mitteilungen des Vereins für Kunde der Aachener Vorzeit, Zehnter Jahrgang 1897, #4/8. pg.64 Online
- Renate Puvogel: Caspar Scheuren (1810–1887). Ein Maler und Illustrator der deutschen Spätromantik. Suermondt-Ludwig-Museum, Aachen 1980
