= Gerdt Hardorff =

German painter, art collector and drawing teacher (1769–1864)

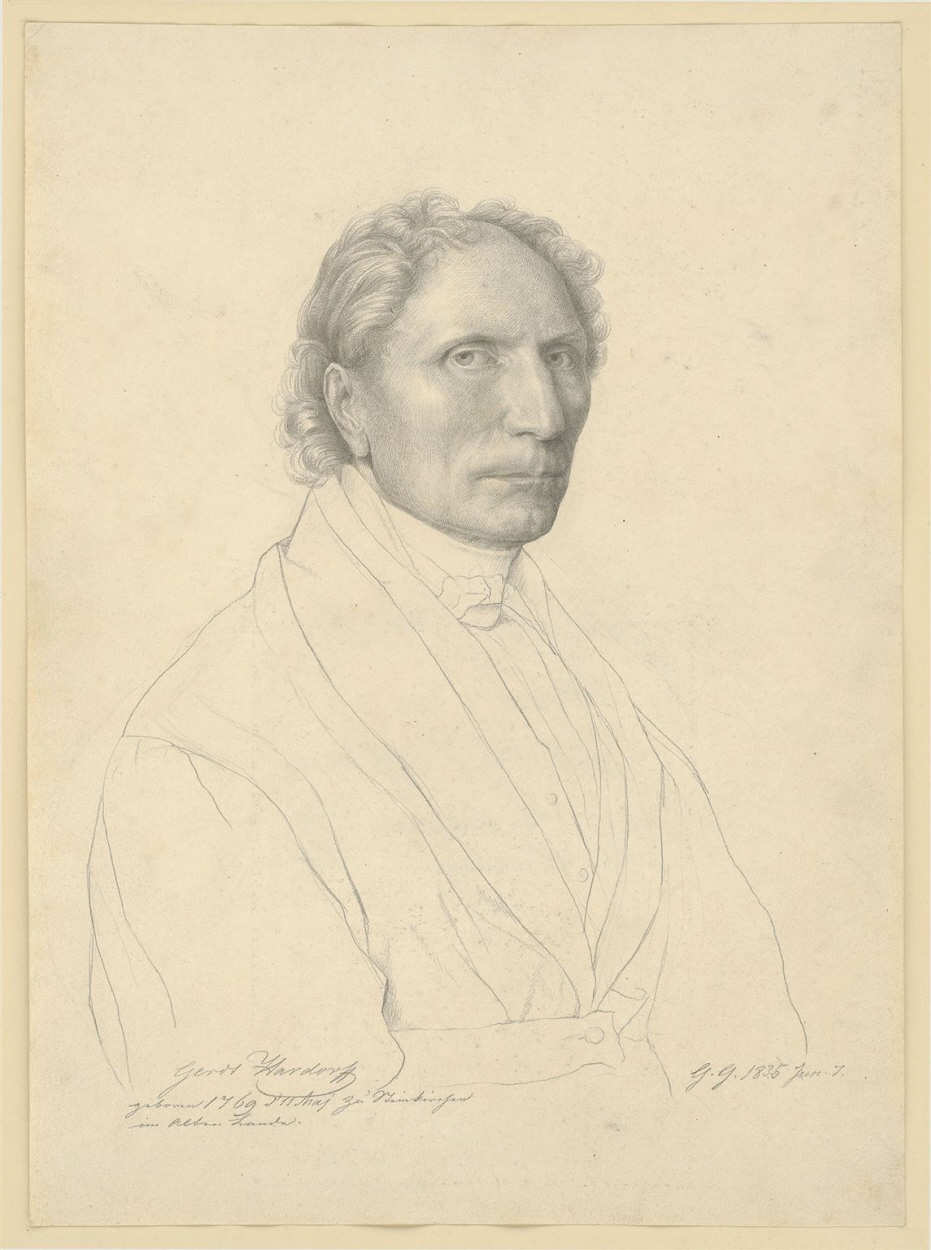
Gerdt Hardorff; portrait by Günther Gensler (1835)

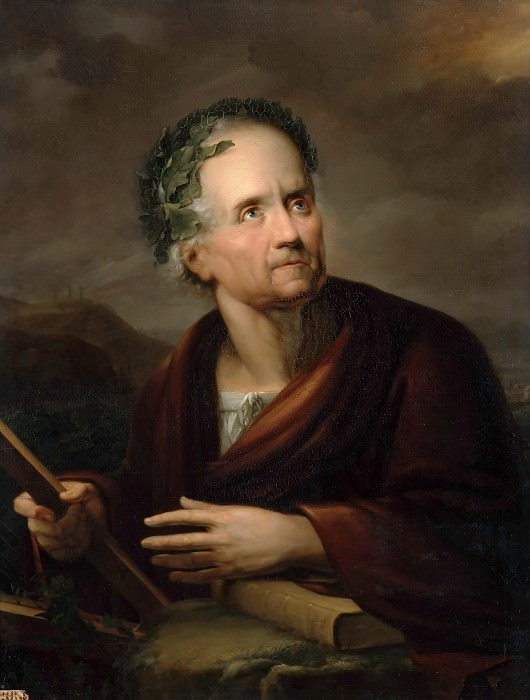
Portrait of the poet, Friedrich Gottlieb Klopstock

Gerdt Hardorff (11 May 1769 – 19 May 1864) was a German painter, art collector and drawing teacher. He is sometimes referred to as The Elder to distinguish him from his son, Gerdt, who also became a painter.

== Biography ==
He was born in Steinkirchen to Gerd Hardorff, a grain merchant, and his wife Alheit, née Dreyer. Shortly before 1780, his family moved to Hamburg. He took his first drawing lessons in 1783, from Johann Anton Tischbein at the Gelehrtenschule des Johanneums. He then attended the drawing school at the "Patriotischen Gesellschaft", and was awarded a silver medal.

From 1788 to 1794, thanks to a scholarship from that institution, he studied at the Dresden Academy of Fine Arts with the portrait painter, Giovanni Battista Casanova. While there, he also carried out artistic studies "from nature". In 1794, the Academy awarded him first prize for his depiction of Cain, after the murder.

That same year, after refusing an offer by Hanns Moritz von Brühl to accompany his son, Carl von Brühl on a trip to Italy, he returned to Hamburg. Within a short time, he received numerous commissions, both for portraits (including one of the famous poet, Friedrich Gottlieb Klopstock) and church decorations.

He became a citizen of Hamburg in 1797, and married his childhood sweetheart, Juliane Mielck, the daughter of a local merchant. In 1802, he became a drawing teacher at the Johanneum. He also taught at the Patriotische Gesellschaft, and a school for the poor, operated by Hieronymus Pasmann. His students included Louis Asher, Günther Gensler, Georg Haeselich, Hermann Kauffmann, Henri Lehmann, Carl Julius Milde, Philipp Otto Runge, Emil Gottlieb Schuback, Heinrich Stuhlmann, Theodor Bülau, Erwin Speckter, Otto Speckter and Friedrich Wasmann, as well as his own sons, Gerdt (1800–1834), Rudolf, and Julius Theodore (1818–1898).

In 1815, he issued his first portfolio of etchings. During the 1820s, he mostly produced portraits. In 1822, he joined the Kunstverein in Hamburg. In his later years, his eyesight gradually worsened and he was forced to retire from his teaching positions in 1849. Three years later, he was presented with an honorary membership in the Hamburger Künstlerverein von 1832.

He died in 1864 in Hamburg, leaving behind a collection of over 5,000 paintings, drawings, and other graphics, which were auctioned off over the next three years. Juliane had preceded him in death by five years. In 1927, a street in Hamburg's Barmbek-Nord district was named after him.

== Sources ==
- Georg Kaspar Nagler: "Hardorf, Gerdt", In: Neues allgemeines Künstler-Lexicon. Vol.5, Verlag E. A. Fleischmann, Munich 1837, pp.559–560 (Online)
- "Hardorff, Gerdt, senior", In: Hamburgisches Künstler-Lexikon, Verein für Hamburgische Geschichte, Hoffmann und Campe, Hamburg 1854, pp.126–127 (Online)
- Joseph Eduard Wessely (1879). "Hardorff, Gerdt senior" . Allgemeine Deutsche Biographie (in German). Vol. 10. Leipzig: Duncker & Humblot. p. 595.
- Alfred Lichtwark: "Gerdt Hardorff Der Ältere", In: Das Bildnis in Hamburg. Kunstverein in Hamburg, Hamburg 1898 (Online)
- Otto Hardorff: "Gerdt Hardorff. Ein vergessener Hamburger Künstler", In: Das Johanneum – Mitteilungen des Vereins ehemaliger Schüler der Gelehrtenschule des Johanneums, Vol.33, #1. December 1935, pp.224–226 (Online).
- Maike Bruhns: "Hardorff, Gerdt d. Ä", In: Der neue Rump. Lexikon der bildenden Künstler Hamburgs, Wachholtz, Neumünster 2013, ISBN 978-3-529-02792-5, pg.176
