= Günther Gensler =

German etcher, illustrator and painter

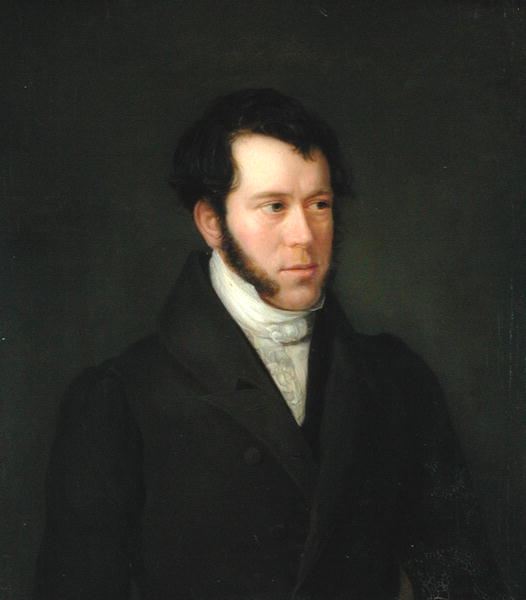
Günther Gensler; portrait by Franz Heesche (1833)

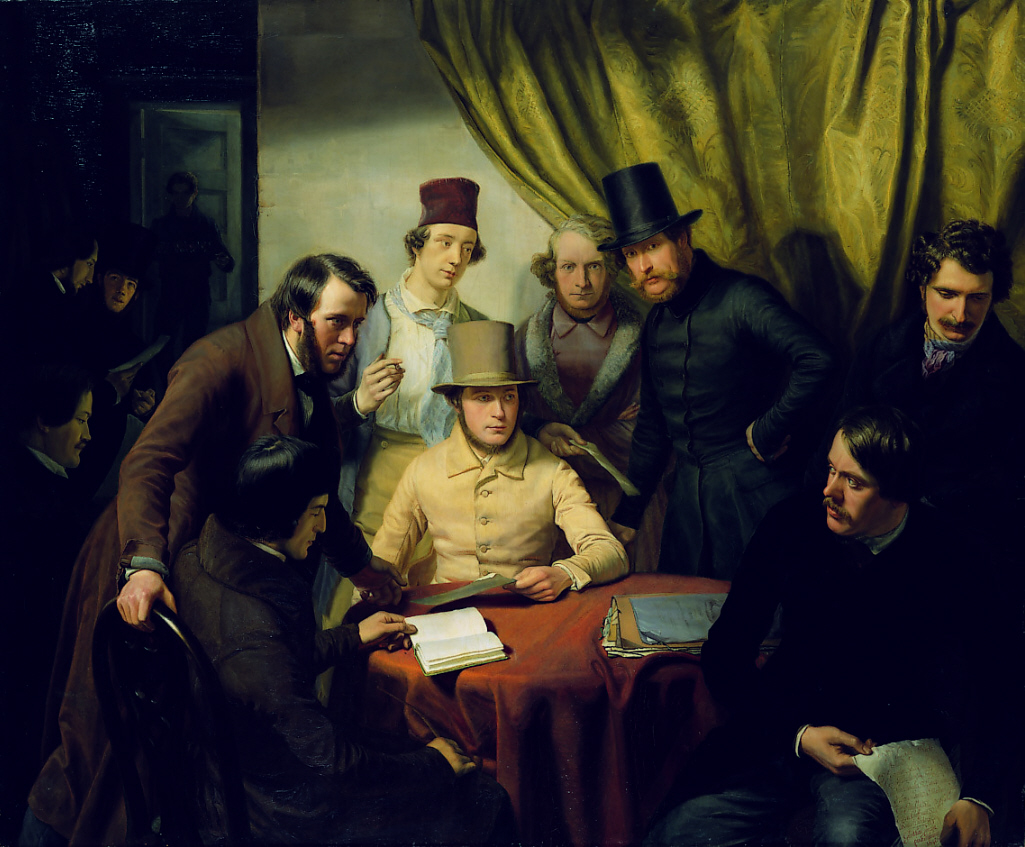
Members of the Hamburger Künstlerverein (1840, identified on the painting's page at Wikimedia Commons)

Johann Günther Gensler (28 February 1803 – 28 May 1884) was a German etcher, illustrator and painter; primarily of portraits. His known work consists of over 120 oil paintings and drawings.

== Life and work ==
He was born in Hamburg. His father was a goldsmith, who drew as a hobby. His younger brothers, lt=Jacob and Martin, also became painters. All three would eventually become members of the Hamburger Künstlerverein, and Jacob served on the Board of Directors. They were also all members of the Hamburger Turnerschaft von 1816, a gymnastics society.

He initially studied with Gerdt Hardorff, a friend of the family. Then, around 1822, he studied with Johann Heinrich Wilhelm Tischbein. By the mid-1820s, he and Martin were teaching art history and drawing at the Gelehrtenschule des Johanneums.

According to documentary records, he was in Dresden in 1829, and travelled to Amsterdam in 1837, where he studied the works of Rembrandt and Bartholomeus van der Helst. The year 1844 found him in Rome, seeking new inspiration, which was apparently not forthcoming.

Gensler died in Hamburg in 1884. In 2019, his works were part of the exhibition, "Hamburger Schule – Das 19. Jahrhundert neu entdeckt", at the Hamburger Kunsthalle.
