= Martin Leyer-Pritzkow =

German art curator

Martin Leyer-Pritzkow (born 2 January 1957 in Düsseldorf) is a German curator and writer about contemporary art. He lives and works in Düsseldorf, Germany.

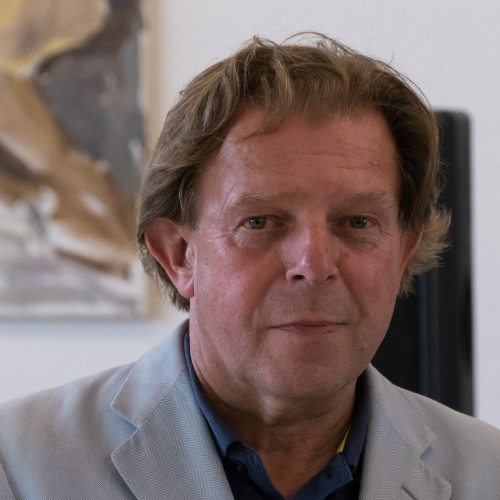
Martin Leyer-Pritzkow at an exhibition with contemporary art in Munich

== Life ==
Martin Leyer-Pritzkow grew up the first years in Düsseldorf. Influenced by his grandfather, who has taken him to many exhibitions of classical modernism as a child, his interest in art developed. At grammar school in Düsseldorf-Gerresheim he received art lessons from Konrad Fischer (artist name: Konrad Lueg) and Gerhard Richter. In the year 1972 Leyer-Pritzkow changed school and graduated for high school in Bonn.

After studying economics at the Universities of Regensburg and Cologne, he began his career in 1983 as a marketing manager at Diners Club International, in Germany. He was director of marketing and sales at a former subsidiary of the 1989 Swiss reinsurance and the "Dr. Harald Quandt Holding ". He subsequently worked as a managing partner of a Direct Marketing company in Munich and consultant for a French consulting company in Lyon. In 1996 he started his own business as an independent curator in Düsseldorf.

== Curatorial activities ==
Martin Leyer-Pritzkow organizes his own exhibitions of contemporary art in Germany and foreign countries. He cares about artistic life works, mediates contemporary fine art and gives lectures about the quality characteristics of contemporary art and strategical collecting. He analysis developments and tendencies of the international art market in newspapers and broadcast.

== Curated exhibitions (selection) ==
- 2016 H50 21K, Domagk Art studios, Munich, Germany
- 2015 Natura nutrix - Homo vorax, Collateralevent of the 56th Venice Biennale with Nevia Pizzul-Capello and Hans-Joachim Petersen at Palazzo Albrizzi, Associaczone Culturale Italo-Tedesca, Venice, Italy
- 2010 Muc-Dus Exchange, White Box, Munich and E.ON Headquarters, Düsseldorf, Germany
- 2001 Young Figuratives, 2001 Carolinen Palais Munich, Germany
- 2002 Young Figuratives Mönchehaus-Museum of Modern Art, Goslar, Germany
- 2000 Adolf Bierbrauer, NRW Forum, Düsseldorf, Germany
- 2000 Young Figurattives Cologne, Germany
- 1999 Young Figuratives Rovigo, Italy
- 1998 Due Dimensioni – Arte Giovane Italia e Germania, Venice, Italy
- 1998 Young German Painters, Decoplage, Miami, USA

== Exhibited artists (selection) ==
Agata Agatowski, Mahssa Askari, Armin Baumgarten, Thomas Bernstein, Christoph Beyer, Sarah Budde, Adolf Bierbrauer, Peter Brüning, Stefan Demary, Thea Djordjadze, Stefan Ettlinger, Fabrizio Gazzarri, Jårg Geismar, Karl Otto Götz, Heinz Hausmann, Hans-Jörg Holubitschka, Gerhard Hoehme, Florian Huth, Jacobo Jarach, Tina Juretzek, Agnieszka Kaszubowska, Horst Keining, Sven Kierst, Anna Krammig, Hendrik Krawen, Augusta Laar, André Lanskoy, Peter Lindenberg, Bernard Lokai, Yoshiyuki Miura, Maria-Elisabetta Novello, Jennifer Rieker, Katrin Roeber, Thomas Ruch, Julia Schewalie, Thyra Schmidt, Emil Schumacher, Brigitte Stenzel, Angelika J. Trojnarski, Fritz Winter et alii.

== Teaching ==
From 1999 to 2008 he was lecturer at the Accademia di Belle Arti di Venezia in Venice.

== Writings ==
- (Ed.): Stefan Ettlinger - Sequenzen, Text Stefan Ettlingern, German / English, 2022, ISBN 978-3-9823565-5-6
- (Ed.).: Inessa Emma, Color Cut Cut Color, Text Helga Meister, Martin Leyer-Pritzkow, German/ English, 2021, ISBN 978-3-9823565-3-2
- (Ed.): Driss Ouadahi, Les murmures, Text Clemens Henle, Martin Leyer-Pritzkow, Geman / English, 2021, ISBN 978-3-9823565-2-5
- (Ed.): Susanne Giring, Volksgarten MON AMOUR, with text by Raimar Stange, Detlef Weinrich, photography: Astrid Piethan und Katja Vielmanns, German / English, 2021, ISBN 978-3-9823565-1-8
- (Ed.).: Hendrik Krawen, der angebrochene Tag, Version II, with text by Andreas Reihse, German / English, 2021, ISBN 978-3-9823565-0-1.
- (Ed.): Atelierbesuche,(art studio visits) with introduction by Lothar Frangenberg; works from Armin Baumgarten, Ralf Berger, Thomas Bernstein, Inessa Emmer, Stefan Ettlinger, Fabrizio Gazzarri, Susanne Giring, Bianca Grüger, Heinz Hausmann, Jörg Paul Janka, Tina Juretzek, Horst Keining, Hendrik Krawen, Katrin Laade, Peter Lindenberg, Bernard Lokai, Dennis Löw, Irina Matthes, Driss Ouadahi, Katrin Roeber, Thomas Ruch, Thyra Schmidt, Stefan Schwarzmüller, Brigitte Stenzel, text German, English, 2021, ISBN 978-3-9820895-9-1
- (Ed.): Bernard Lokai - with introduction by Gertrud Peters (German / English), 2021, ISBN 978-3-9820895-8-4
- Ed.): Brigitte Stenzel - Malerei, with introduction by Anne Rodler (German, English), 2021, ISBN 978-3-9820895-7-7
- (Ed.): SENNOLIO-Ensemble spielt Hausmusik (ein fiktives Konzert), with text by Heinz Hausmann and Martin Leyer-Pritzkow, 2020, ISBN 978-3-9820895-6-0.
- (Ed.).: The Pioneer of Social Sculpture I - Adolf Bierbrauer, (englisch), with text by Martin Leyer-Pritzkow, 2020, ISBN 978-3-9820895-5-3.
- (Ed.): Zündhölzchen macht Chässhüttli (German / English) with text by Maren Knapp Voith concernin the works from Thomas Ruch, Düsseldorf 2020, ISBN 978-3-9820895-4-6.
- (Ed.): Lilla von Puttkamer - Portraits without people (German/ English), with an Interview by Lilla von Puttkamer, Düsseldorf 2020, ISBN 978-3-9820895-3-9.
- (Ed.): Tina Juretzek, FROM PAST TO FUTURE (German / English), with an interview by Tina Juretzek), Düsseldorf 2019, ISBN 978-3-9820895-2-2.
- (Ed.).: Armin Baumgarten, Adolf Bierbrauer: ZWISCHEN WELTEN. Düsseldorf 2019, ISBN 3-00-012777-1. (German / English), with text by Martin Leyer-Pritzkow)
- (Ed.).: Dennis Löw: Körper und Materie (Body and Matter).(German / English) Düsseldorf 2019, ISBN 978-3-00-061930-4.
- (Ed.): Stefan Ettlinger: Deponatur. Düsseldorf 2019, ISBN 978-3-9820895-0-8. (German / English), with text by Martin Leyer-Pritzkow
- (Ed.): Due Dinemsioni, Giovane Arte in Italia e Germania Texts by Massimo Dona, Fabrizio Gazzarri, Martin Leyer-Pritzkow, Tonato Antonio and Luigi Viola, in English, Italian and German language, Leyer-Pritzkow, Düsseldorf 1998, ISBN 3-926820-61-6.
- (Ed.): Adolf Bierbrauer, in English and German language, Leyer-Pritzkow, Düsseldorf 2000, ISBN 3-926820-70-5.
- (Ed.): Young Figuratives, in English and German language, Ketterer Kunst, Munich 2001. ISBN 3-00-007375-2.
- (Ed.): Fabrizio Gazzarri: Dialoghi Inversi – Fabrizio Gazzarri, in English, Italian and German language, Leyer-Pritzkow, Düsseldorf 2003. ISBN 3-00-012419-5.
- with Klaus Sebastian: Das Kunstkaufbuch (The Art Purchase Book) Prestel, Munich, Berlin, London, New York, 2005. ISBN 3-7913-3359-3.
- Limits of freedom, the aesthetics of the moment, the introduction to the photography of the artist Sven Kierst, in English and German, dauvi-Verlag, Bergheim 2012, ISBN 978-3-937855-06-6.

== Television ==
- Television Interview with Munic TV about the curated exhibition H50 21K in Domagk Studios, Munic with Christopher Griebel (German Language), 2016
