= Mary Sara =

Japanese model and singer

Sara Mary 紗羅マリー
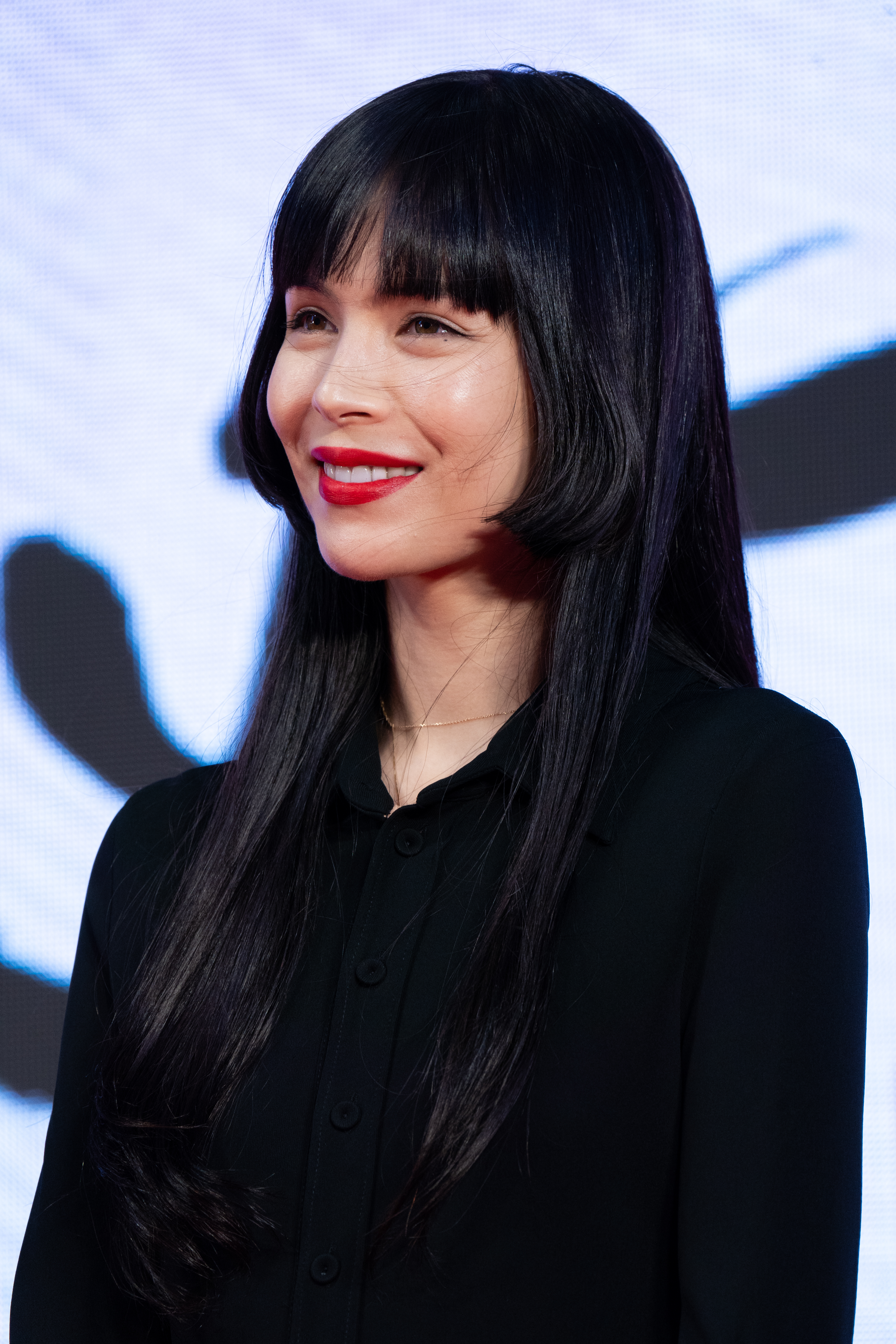
- Sara in 2019
- Born: December 12, 1986 (age 39); Nagoya, Aichi Prefecture, Japan
- Modeling information
- Height: 1.67 m (5 ft 5 1/2 in)
- Hair color: Black
- Eye color: Brown
- Website: www.avexnet.or.jp/saramary/

Mary Sara (紗羅マリー, Sara Marī) is a Japanese fashion model and a newly launched J-pop singer. Her singing style was compared by Oricon to Pink's.

Born December 12, 1986, in Nagoya, she is under the Tokyo-based LesPros Entertainment.

She first became a model in 2000, when she was 13 years old. She is the lead singer of Learners, a Japanese rock band specializing in British and American oldies.

== Early life ==
Born in Nagoya, Aichi Prefecture, Japan on December 12, 1986, to an American father and a Japanese mother.

== Performances ==
=== TV ===
- ロンブー淳の惚れさせシェフ (2009.9.2, Asahi Broadcasting Corporation)

=== Film ===
- Smokin' on the Moon (2018)
- Niwatori Phoenix (2022)

=== Discography ===
- Cherry/Gossip (2010.4.7, Avex Trax, produced by Jeff Miyahara)
- Learners / "Learners" (2017)
- Learners / "More Learners" (2018)
- Learners / "Learners High" (2019)
- Learners / "Hello, Stranger" (2020)

=== Commercials ===
- Kao Corporation
- 近鉄パッセ
- Studio Alta

=== Magazine covers ===
- Vivi
- Nicola
- Cutie
- Zipper
- So-En
- Non-no
- Jille
- An-an
- Olive
- Seda
- Keda
- Pretty Style
- Street Jack
- Mini
- Hot-Dog Press
- Vita
- Mina

=== Stage appearances ===
- Tokyo Girls Collection
- EARTH MUSIC & ECOLOGY
- CANDY STRIPPER
- Do! Family
- KOSUKE TSUMURA「Niyabru」
- 宝島社合同ファッションショー（台湾）
- La FORET COLLECTION NIIGATA
