= Adolf Bierbrauer =

German painter

Adolf Bierbrauer (26 July 1915 – 2 September 2012) was a German conceptual artist, painter and sculptor. He is known for his "hypnosis paintings" and "somnambulistic paintings" as well as for his sculptures.

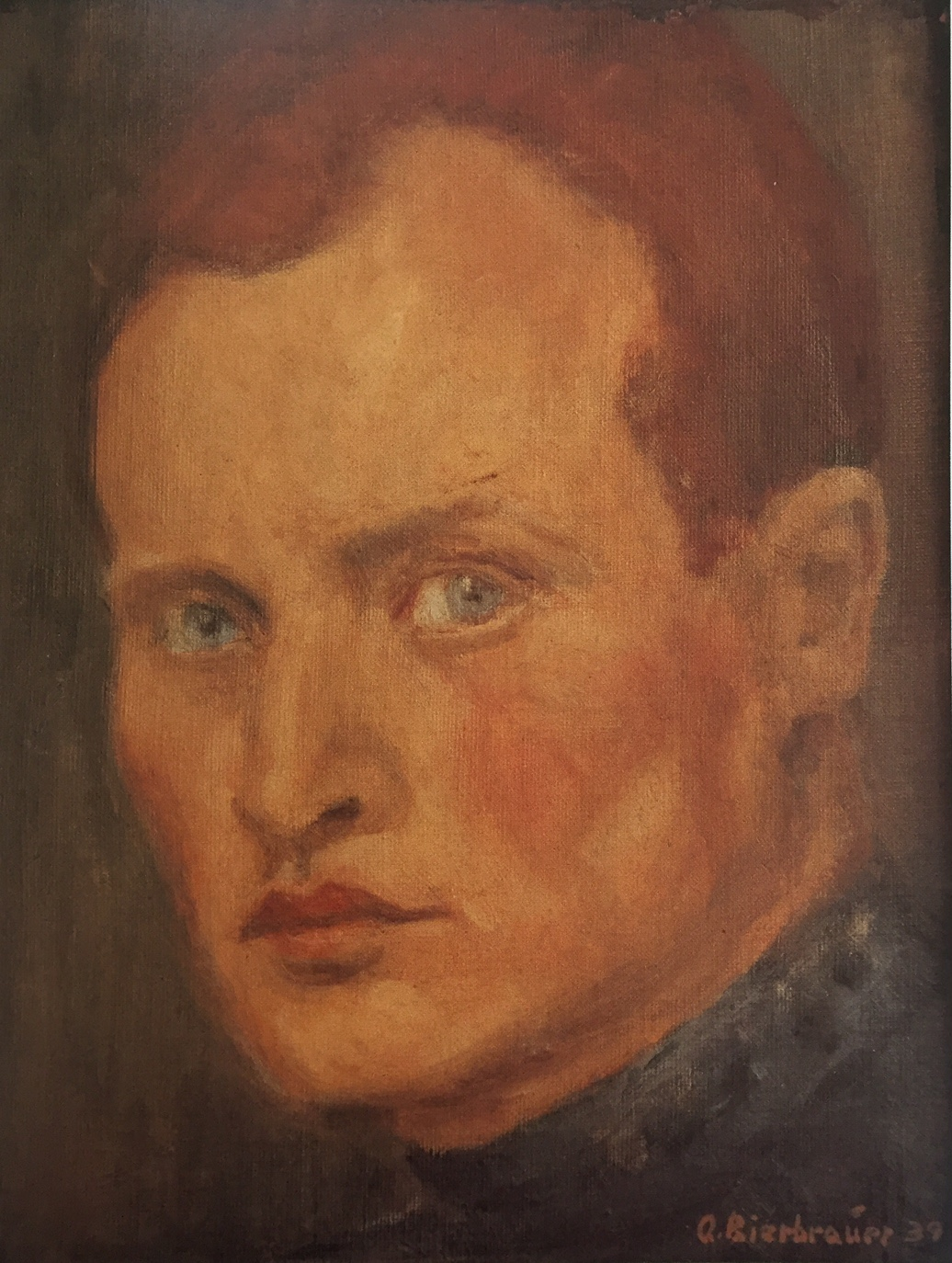
Adolf Bierbrauer, Self-portrait, oil on canvas on hard board relined, 28 cm x 21,5 cm,1939

== Life ==
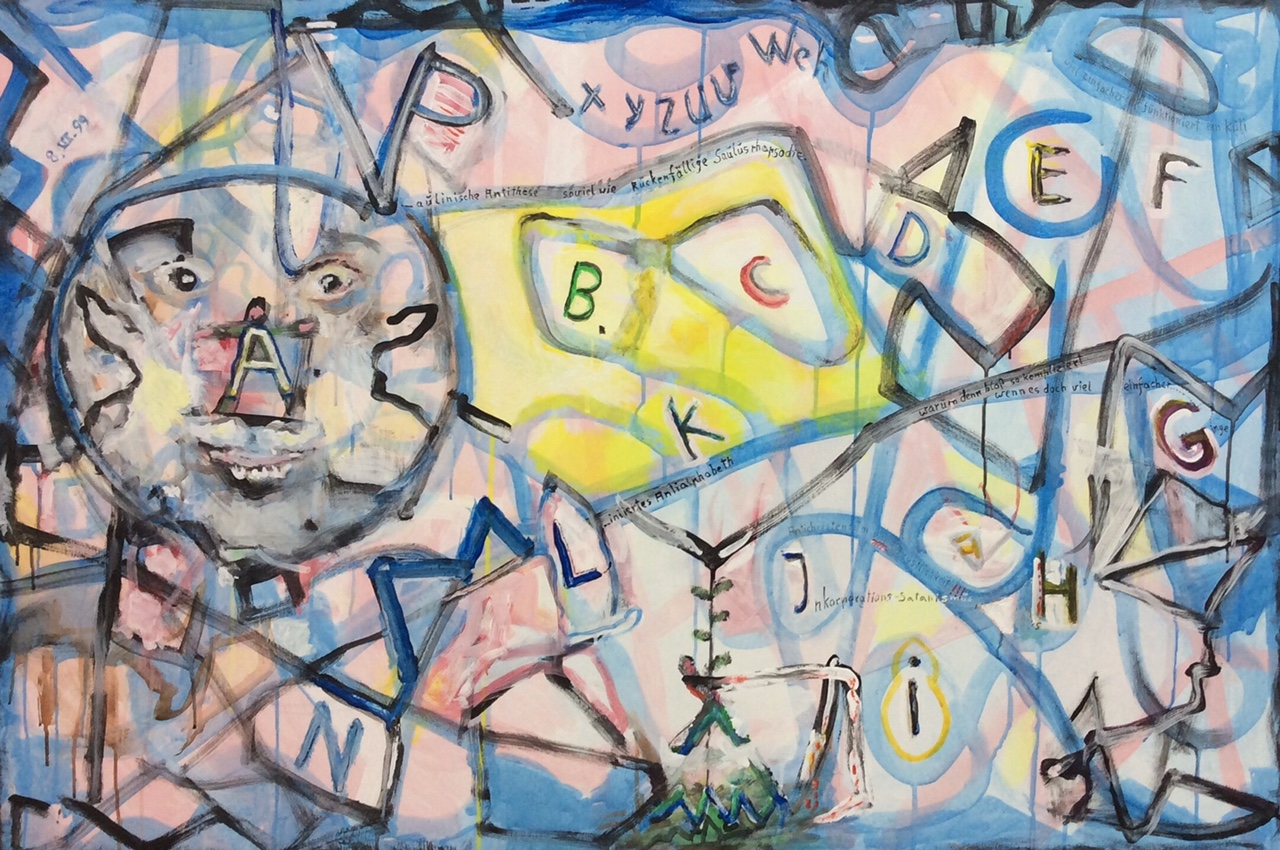
Anti Christianity without fear, Acrylic on canvas, 80 cm x 120 cm, 1999

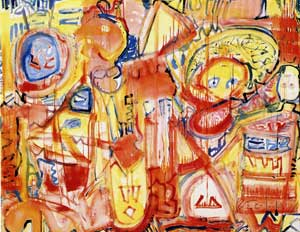
Adolf Bierbrauer, Desperate Search of the Inner Face, somnambulistic work, Acryic on canvas, 160 cm x 200 cm, 1999

Adolf Bierbrauer grew up with two sisters, Marianne and Gisela, on Glücksburger street in Düsseldorf-Oberkassel. His father was the manager of the ironworks Association in Düsseldorf.

During his high school years Bierbrauer studied piano and performed in public as a piano soloist. His piano teacher recommended the philosophical work of Rudolf Steiner to him. In 1930 Bierbrauer produced his first still life and within a year began his first figurative drawings. He created portraits of people in his neighborhood. In 1934 he traveled to the Goetheanum in Dornach (Switzerland) to study the works of Rudolf Steiner. In 1935, he began his study of medicine at the University of Marburg. He continued his study of medicine at Freiburg, Jena and at the Medical Academy in Düsseldorf. From 1940 to 1942, he served in the military service in France.

In 1942, Bierbrauer was called back to Düsseldorf due to the lack of military available in Düsseldorf during World War II. He received his doctorate there in 1943 and in January 1945 he sent to the Eastern Front as a military doctor. He was captured in Wrocław and transported to Transcaucasia (Mingitschaur) to work as a roadbuilder and concrete worker as a Russian prisoner of war.

During his imprisonment, on behalf of the prisoner-of-war camp management Bierbrauer painted documentary images of the geological investigations of the terminal moraines. The prisoners also worked on archaeological excavations of medean graves. He was forbidden from painting and was ordered to create portraits of the guards.

In 1949, he returned to Düsseldorf where he became a volunteer physician at the University Hospital in Hamburg. From 1951 to 1953, he worked as psychotherapist at the 2nd Medical Academy in Düsseldorf, specializing in hypnosis treatments. At this time he began the creation of his first hypnosis paintings.

== Hypnosis images as pioneers of social sculpture ==
The first hypnosis images were created. “Bierbrauer painted the ‘hypnosis images’ based on the descriptions of images that appeared to his patients in a trance state.” It was his idea to use hypnosis as an alternative to the electroconvulsive therapy commonly used at the time to treat severe depression, in order to access patients' innermost selves in a more humane way. At the same time, he painted what had been entrusted to him so that he could discuss it with the patients when they awoke. The stories conveyed told of a soldier who shot his superior in the trenches, of the guilt of a husband whose wife terminated her pregnancy, and of sexual violence in a relationship. Due to the limited treatment time, these pictures were all only 21 × 29 cm in size and created as brush drawings.

His public opposition against electroshock therapy and insulin shock treatments lead to his release from hospital in 1953/1954.

During the summer semester, he attended a class called on monumental painting and wall painting under the direction of Otto Gerster at the Kölner Werkschulen. He applied to the Kunstakademie Düsseldorf but was rejected.

In 1954 he received the circular medical certificate to establish himself as a general medical practitioner. Bierbrauer now specialized on nervous disorders and psychosomatic disorders. He focused on therapies that utilized hypnosis.

After 1960, he began making somnambulistic paintings. A heart attack in 1965 forced Bierbrauer to end working as a doctor. In 1973, he declared himself to be a freelance artist and started teaching painting lessons to children at his home. These lessons later became the first Waldorf kindergarten in Düsseldorf. Bierbrauer also worked as a pianist in Waldorf schools. In 1974 he applied again to the Kunstakademie Düsseldorf and was accepted. He spent two years there. At the same time he attended lectures of philosophy at Heinz Rudolf at the Heinrich Heine University Düsseldorf.

Starting in 1990, Bierbrauer created art which he described as Müllkunst (trash art). 1998 Bierbrauer moved to the anthroposophically oriented Heinrich-Zschokke Senior house in Düsseldorf-Gerresheim, that he also initiated. In 2000, his works were presented to the general public during the presentation of his monography at the NRW Forum for the first time. Bazon Brock and Gabriele Lohberg, Director of the Europäische Kunstakademie Trier (European Academy of Fine Arts Trier) held the introduction speeches.(1)

Life in Anthroposophic Senior home became intolerable to him. Some of his art works were destroyed due to unannounced renovations at his senior home.(2) At age 91 he moved to a new senior him in the Kasierwerther Diakonie, Ratingen.

In 2012 Bierbrauer was involved in the exhibition "The Great," at the Museum Kunst Palast Düsseldorf where his hypnosis works were on display. He attended the exhibition. In the autumn of the same year Bierbrauer died of heart failure.(3)

== Work ==
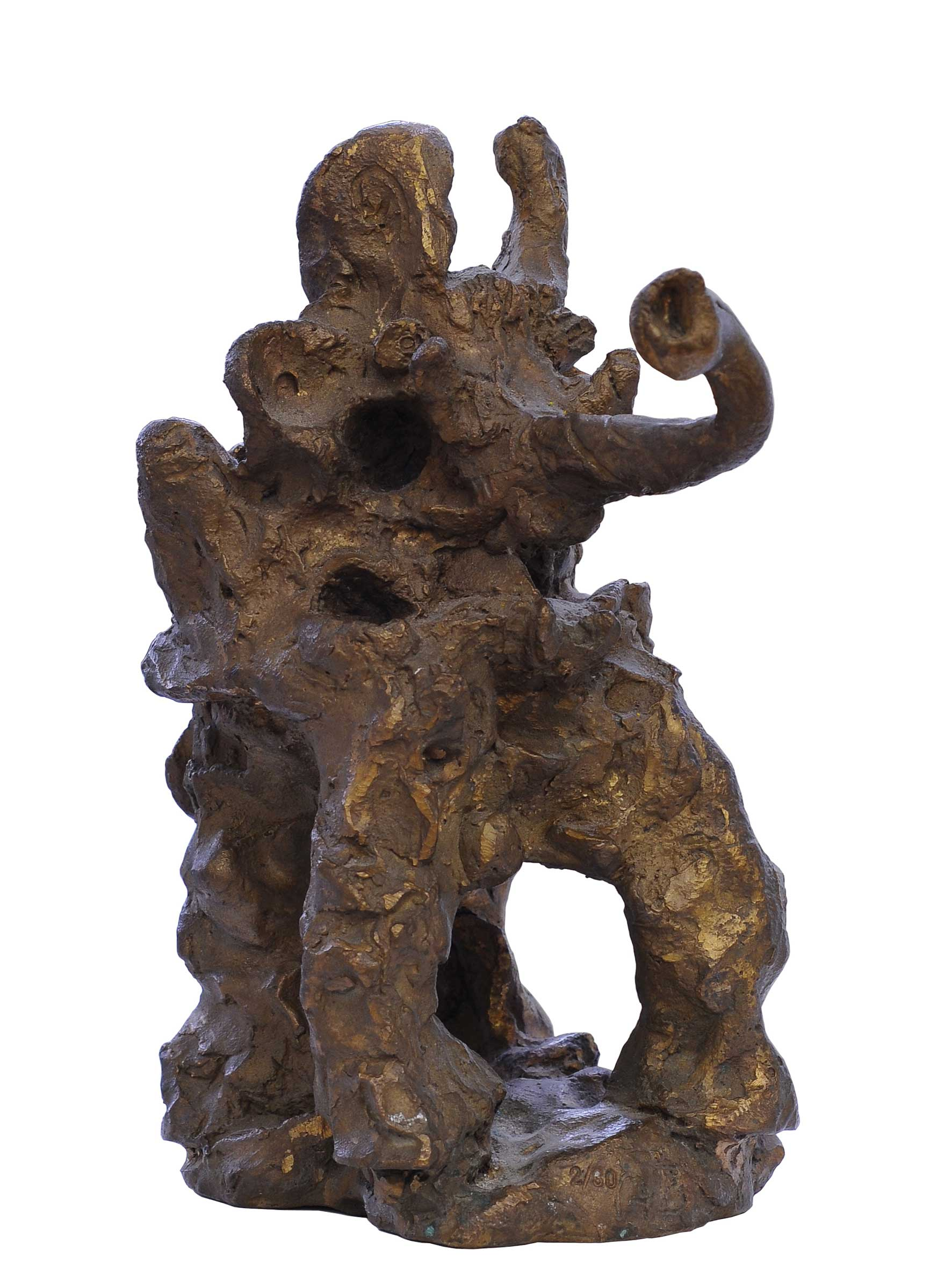
Adolf Bierbrauer, the elephantine tantrum, Bronze sculpture, 2002, Vol. 30

Bierbrauer's key works are his hypnosis pictures from the early 1950s, his somnambulistic works, and his sculptures.

The focus of his work is the human being. In his early work pure representations of people, such as portraits and nudes can be found. He approached his artwork with concepts drawn from his background as a physician and psychotherapist, applying concepts of the human psyche to his work.

Bierbrauer painted the hypnosis images after stories and pictures from his patients in trance. They were created after the end of World War II created until the early 1950s. Bierbrauer's art involved his work as a psychotherapist- using what he saw during hypnosis and narration from his patients, who were overcoming the personal traumas left by war. He claimed that he painted his pictures for the patients, in order to connect with them. He believed his works helped the patients while the patients' assisted his development as an artist creating works centered on the human psyche. In his understanding the artist could be a healer. With these works he had been one of the pioneers of the conceptual art movement in the 1960s in Europe.

His hypnosis paintings were accompanied with Bazon Brock and a performance of Joseph Beuys washing feet. Bazon Brock wrote in his book "Der Barbar als Kulturheld" (The barbarian as a cultural hero): "The results of these images that emerged then, are ultimately that important because they are artistic formally on the absolute highest level of its time. There is nothing comparable in the '50s."^{(5)}

For Bierbrauer, since the late 1960s somnambulistic work had many parallels to works by informal artists like Emilio Vedova and Emil Schumacher. Their techniques are comparable also to the works of the abstract expressionism by Jackson Pollock or Jean-Michel Basquiat. Bierbrauer, trained by the hypnosis of his patients, began in this period to abstract from the patient's images and now betook himself into a somnambulistic, in a daydream-like state. He made paintings based on the "incorporation" of others and the search for his own identity.

Bierbrauer also produced sculptures. In his bronze figures such as the elephantine tantrum from 2001 he used an expressive free, unbound to the concrete form design, which received its informal expression which is increased by the titles-finding. They appear as trash-like sculptures, mostly composed of found material (see also Arte povera), connected with glue, metal wires and tinfoil.

== Gallery Samples Hypnosis paintings ==
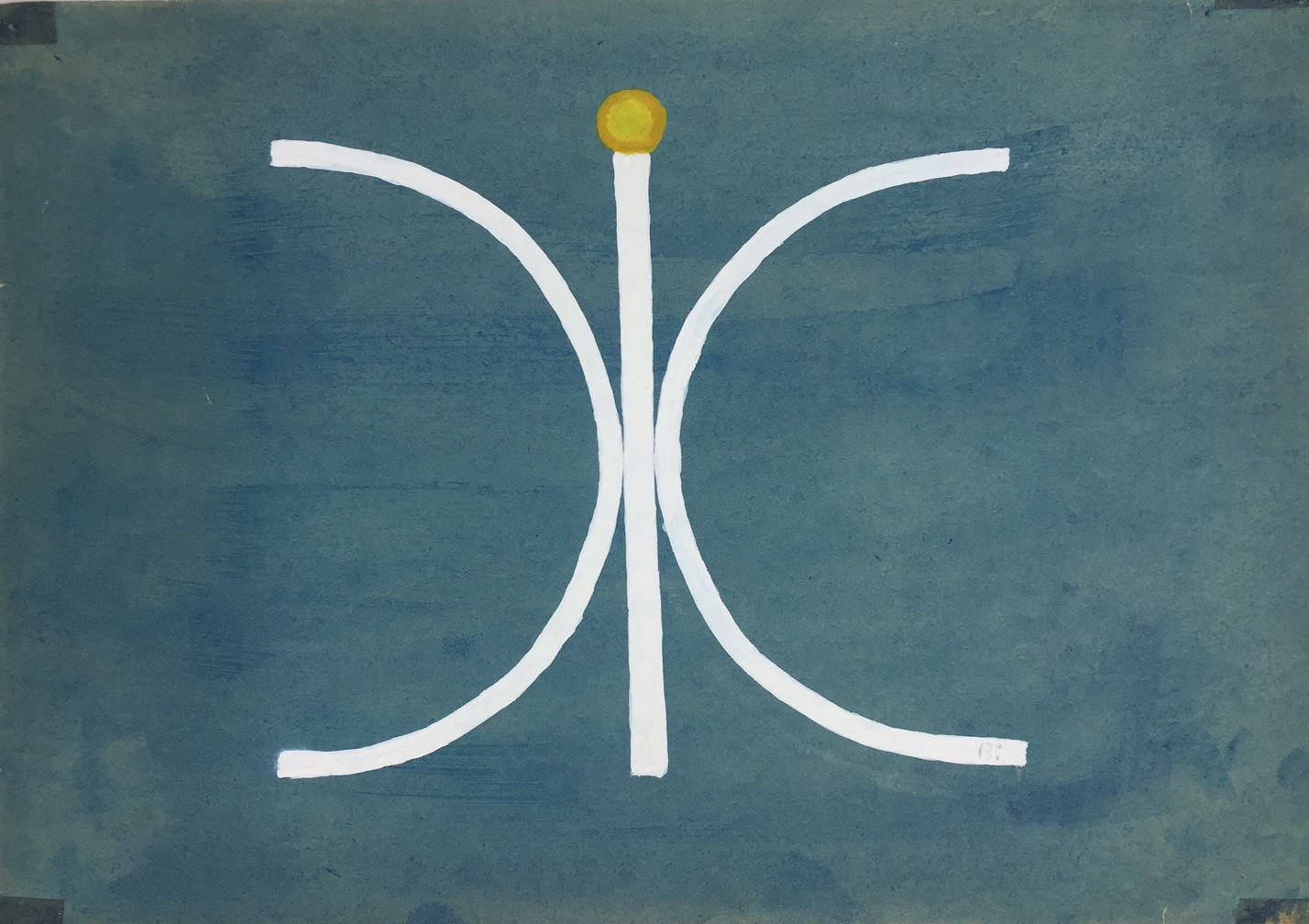

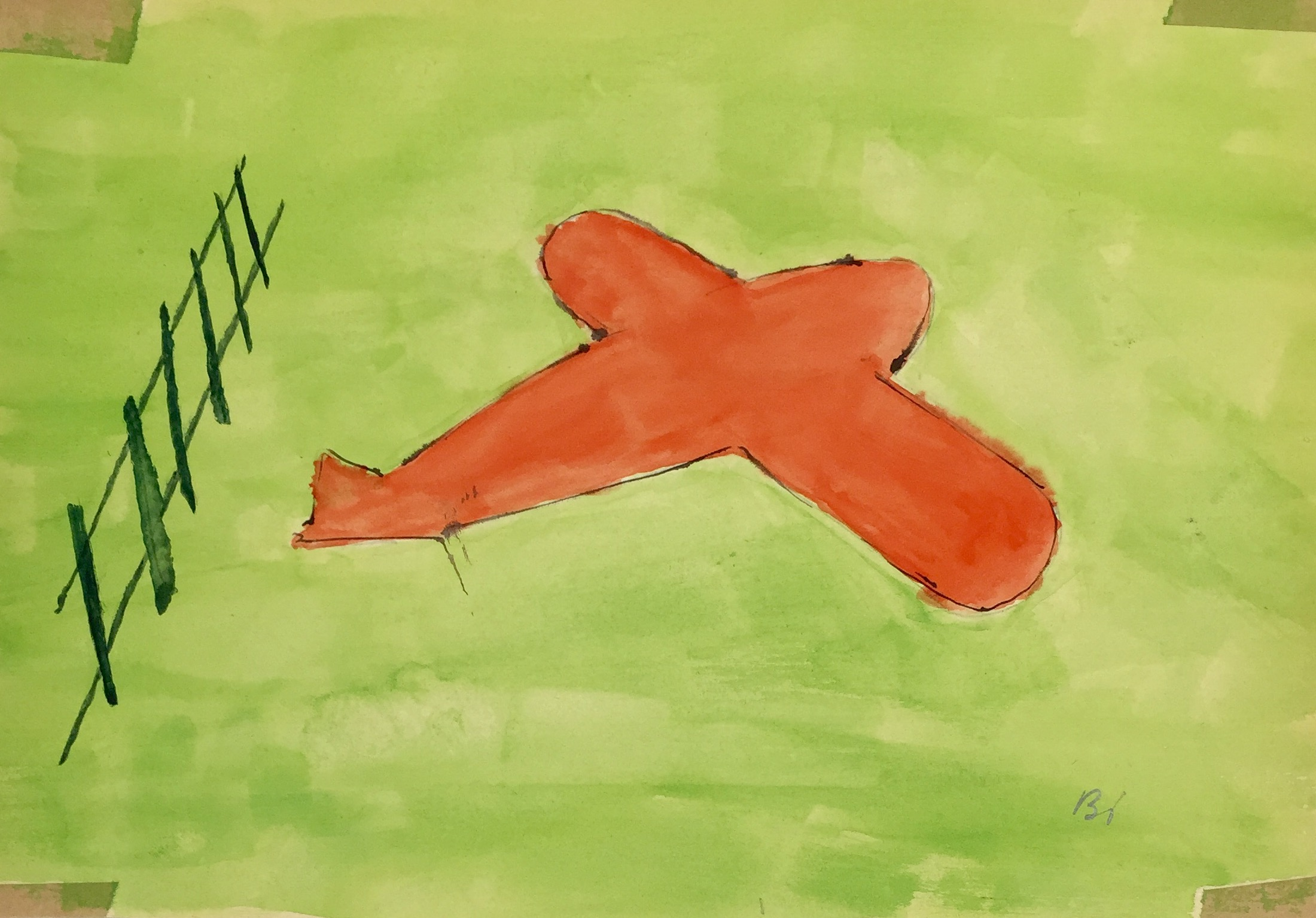

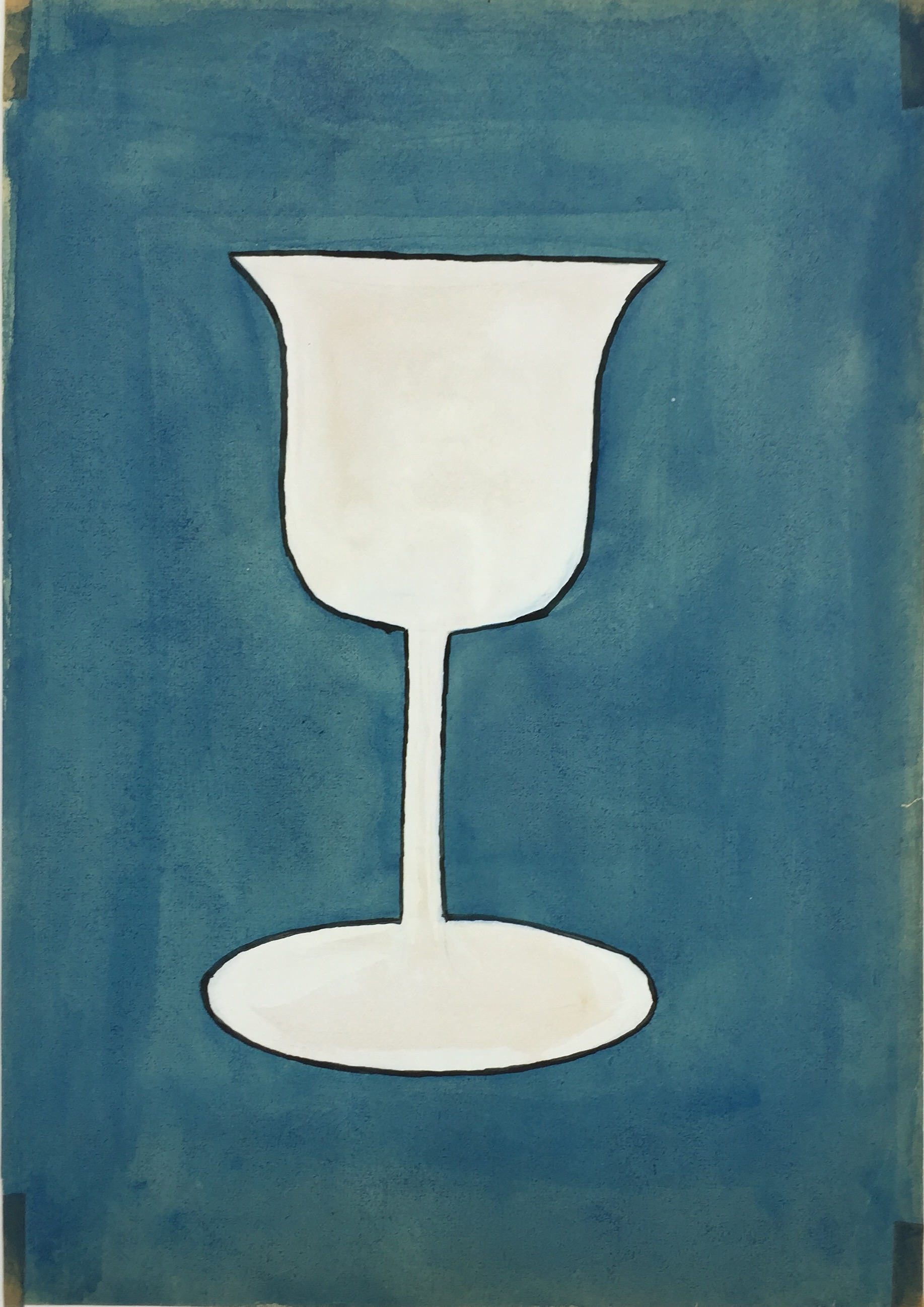

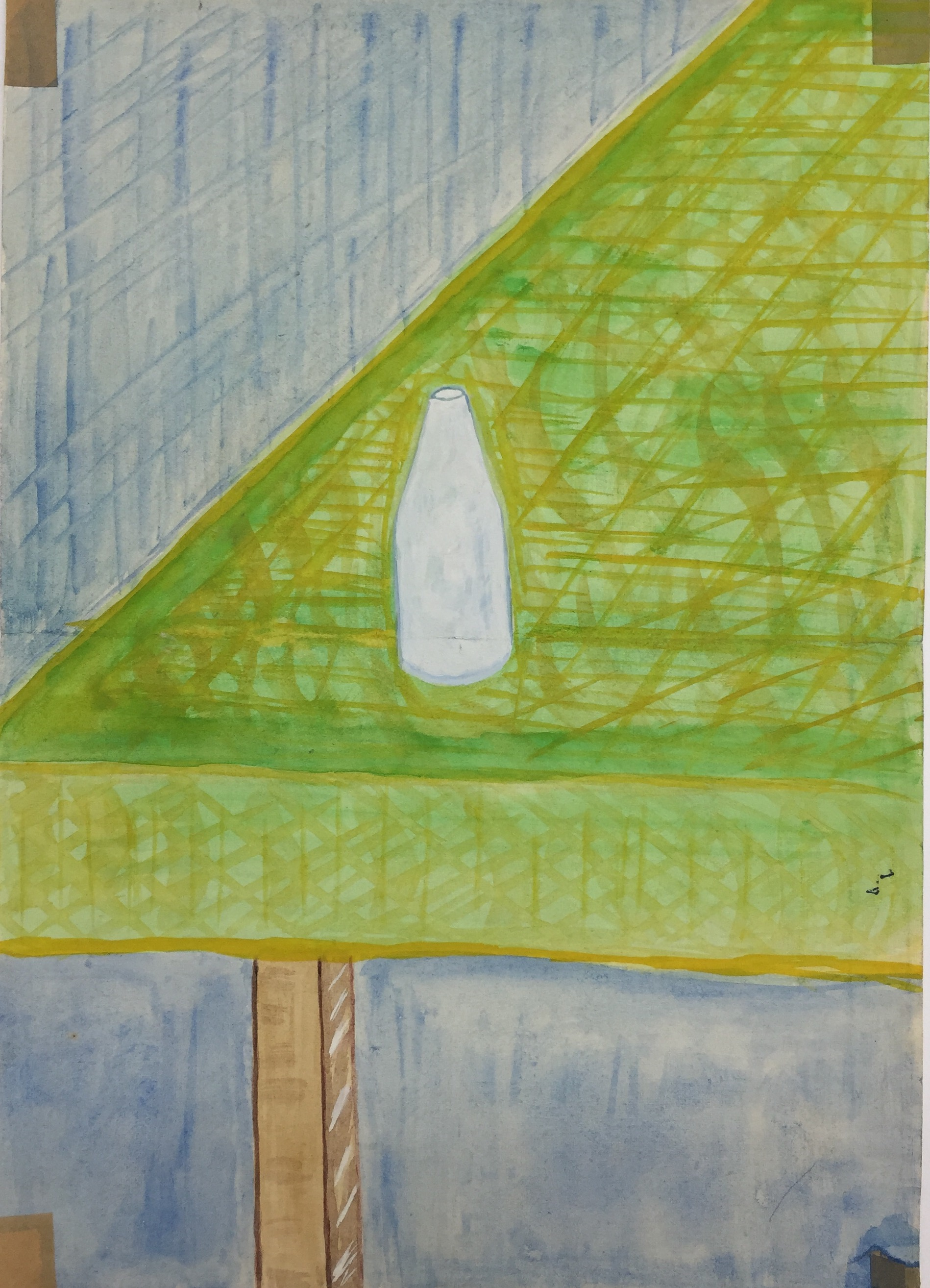

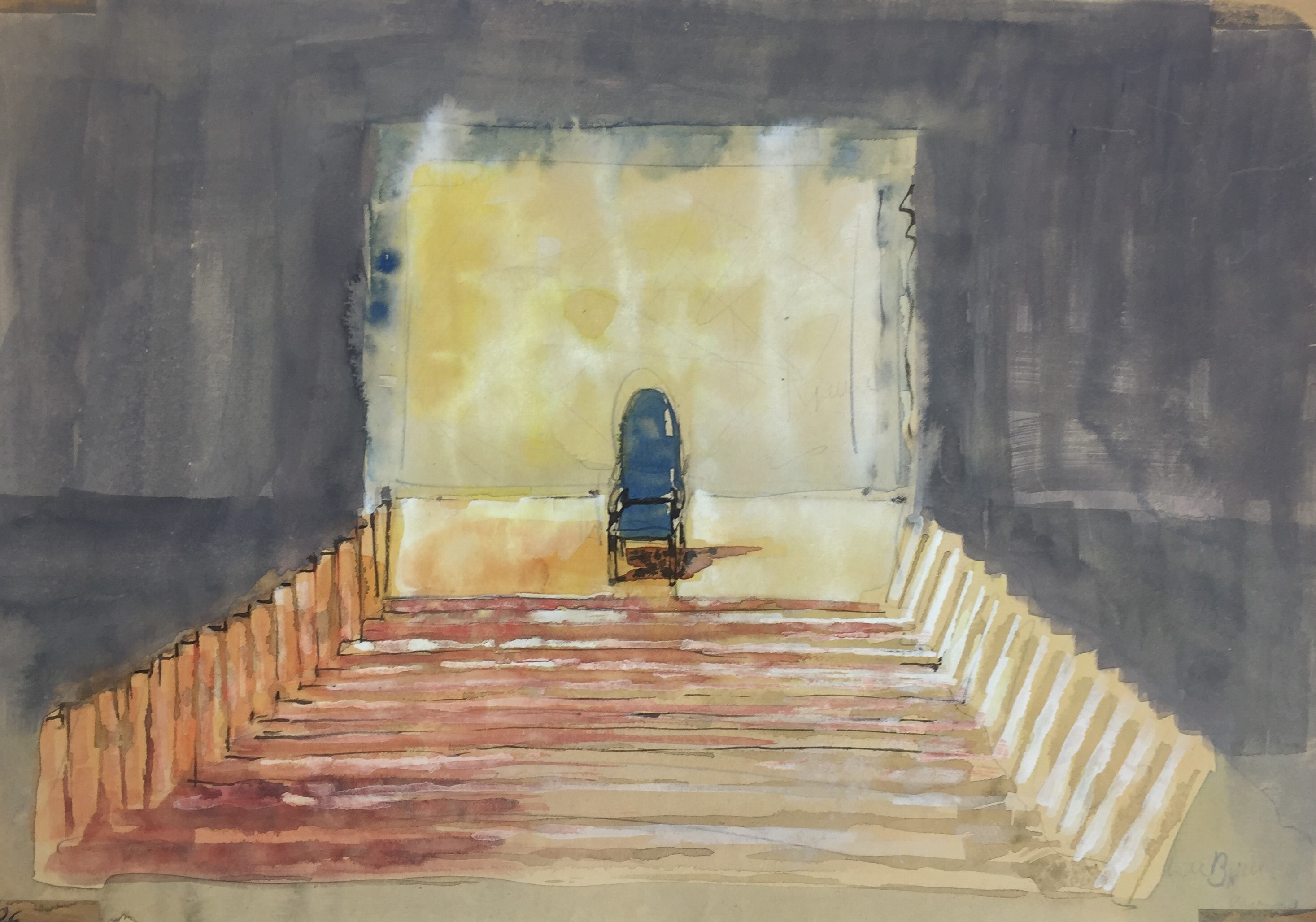

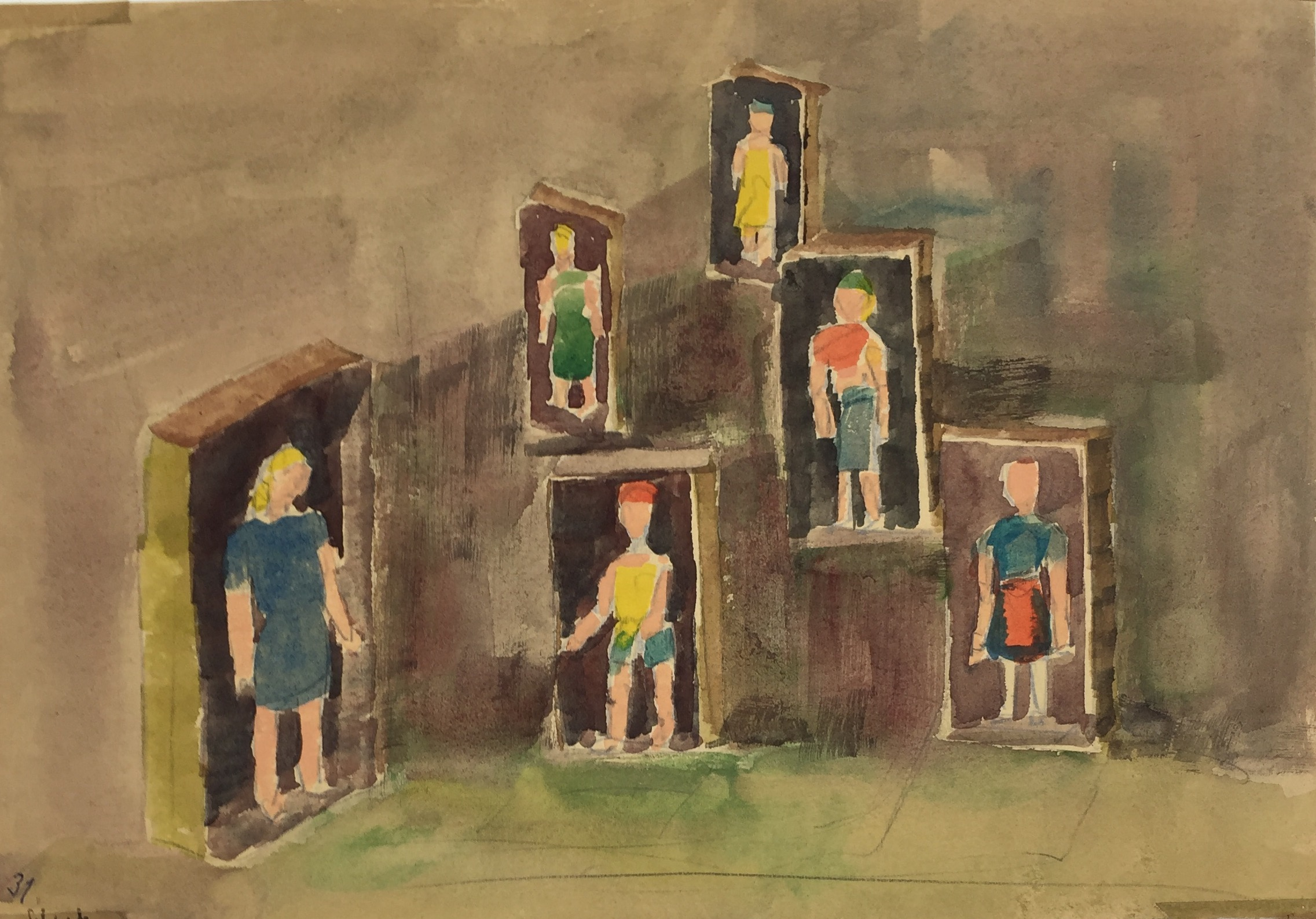

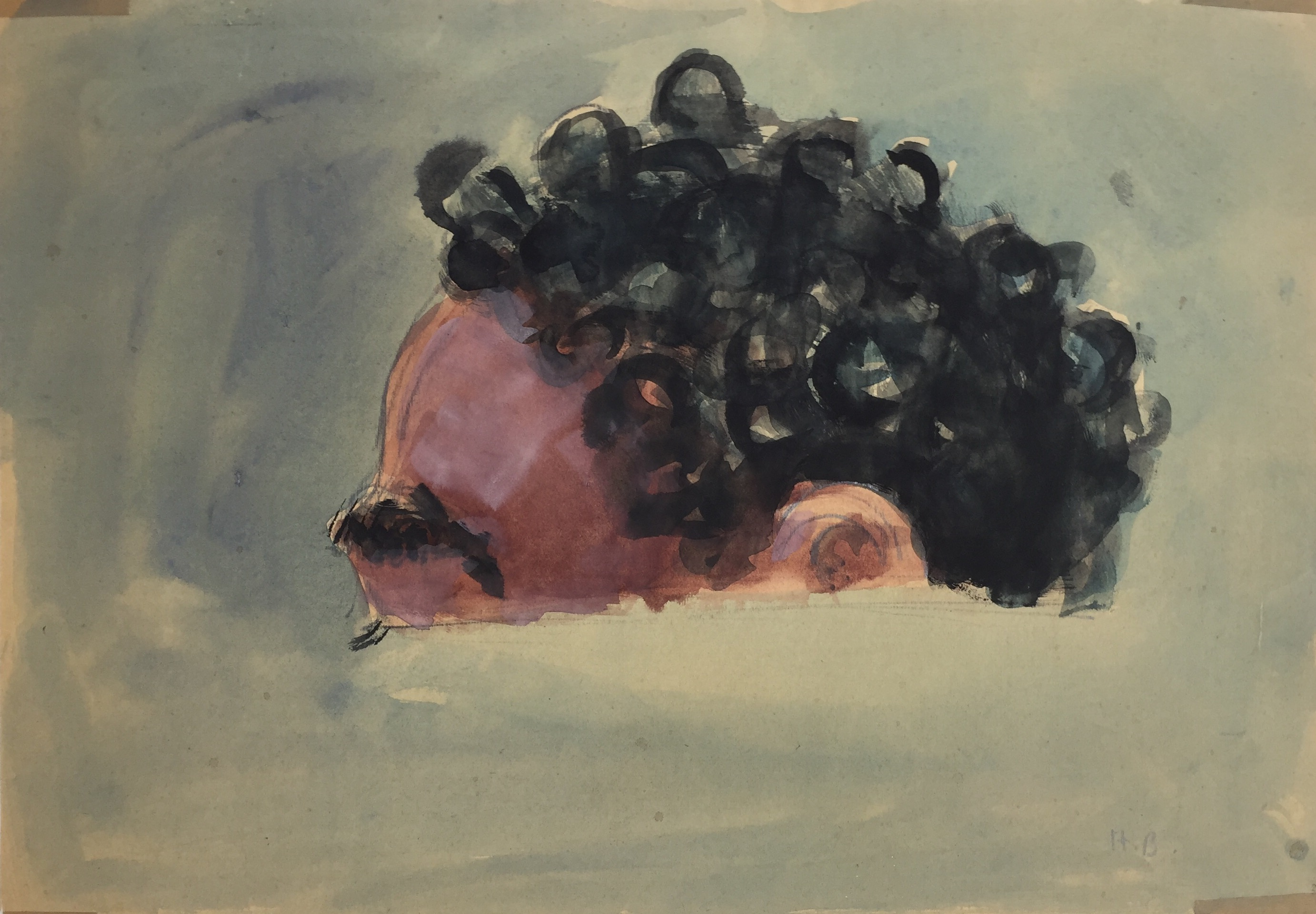

== Art market ==
Adolf Bierbrauer did no publicly show case his work until age 85, because he deemed his work a private matter. He did not receive public attention until the release of his monograph, when he gained public exposure. ^{(4)}

== Exhibitions ==
- 2026 Das innere Gesicht auf Reisen with Bierbrauers hypnotic and somnabulic works, curated by Christian Deckert, Maxhaus Düsseldorf
- 2026 " Von mir aus" with works from Adolf Bierbrauer, Armin Baumgarten, Ralf Berger, Woytek Berowski, Stefan Demary, Heinz Hausmann, Stefan Ettlinger, Hans-Jörg Holubitschka, Fabrizio Gazzarri, Ewa Jaczynska, Hendrik Krawen, Peter Lindenberg, Driss Ouadahi, Katrin Roeber and Stefan Schwarzmüller, Leyer-Pritzkw Ausstellunge, Düsseldorf
- 2024 Kleine Nachtmeerfahrt, with works by Bianca C. Grüger und with the hypnosisipaintings by Adolf Bierbrauer, Martin Leyer-Pritzkow, Düsseldorf
- 2023 The paintings of Souls with the Japanese Artist Takakazu Takeuchi, Martin Leyer-Pritzkow, Düsseldorf
- 2022 VOM TRAUM ZUM BILD (From Dream to Picture) with the somnambulistic works from Adolf Bierbrauer, Martin Leyer-Pritzkow, Düsseldorf
- 2022 OUR FRIENDS with works from Adolf Bierbrauer, Stefan Demary, Jårg Geismar and Hans-Jörg Holubitschka; Martin Leyer-Pritzkow, Düsseldorf
- 2020 Thomas Bernstein - Adolf Bierbrauer Skulpturen (sculptures), Martin Leyer-Pritzkow, Düsseldorf
- 2020 Pioneer of Social Sculpture - Part I, Adolf Bierbrauer's Hypnosispaintings, Martin Leyer-Pritzkow, Düsseldorf
- 2019 ZWISCHEN WELTEN / BETWEEN WORLDS, with Armin Baumgarten, Martin Leyer-Pritzkow, Düsseldorf
- 2015 Der Andere in mir – Adolf Bierbrauers Hypnosearbeiten (The other in me: Adolf Bierbrauer's hypnotic works), Onomato, Düsseldorf.
- 2015 Natura nutrix- Homo vorax, Associazione Culturale Italo-Tedesca, Palazzo Albrizzi, collateral-event of the 56th Venice Biennale, Italy
- 2014 Man kann es auch übertreiben (It can be overdone), Martin Leyer-Pritzkow, Düsseldorf
- 2012 The Great, Museum Kunst Palast, Düsseldorf
- 2012 Auf der Suche nach dem verlorenen Ich (In Search of the Lost Identity), Municipal Gallery Schwabach, Germany
- 2008 Tribute to Adolf Bierbrauer, Martin Leyer-Pritzkow, Duesseldorf
- 2002 The Archaic in art, Bierbrauer's works on the example of works from the collection of Prof. Hentrich, Duesseldorf
- 2001 People pictures, group exhibition with works by Armin Baumgarten, Woytek Berowski, Adolf Bierbrauer and Fabrizio Gazzarri, Martin Leyer-Pritzkow, Duesseldorf
- 2000 NRW Forum, solo exhibition with presentation of the Bierbrauer monograph, Düsseldorf
- 1998 A. Bierbrauer, Martin Leyer-Pritzkow, Düsseldorf

== Literature ==
- John C. Welchmann, Royal Book Lodge, with artworks from Adolf Bierbrauer, André Butzer, Raymond Pettibon, Jason Rhoades e.a., Hatje Cantz Publishing Berlin 2023, ISBN 978-3-7757-5138-4
- The Pioneer of Social Sculpture I - Adolf Bierbrauer, edited by Martin Leyer-Pritzkow, text in English, Düsseldorf 2020, ISBN 978-3-9820895-5-3
- ZWISCHEN WELTEN / BETWEEN WORLDS, Martin Leyer-Pritzkow (Publ.) with works of Adolf Bierbrauer and Armin Baumgarten, with text German / English, Düsseldorf 2019, ISBN 978-3-982-0895-15
- Christiane Fricke, Durable "Köttelkarnickel", Handelsblatt, Live app., 23 May 2013 (4)
- Bertram Müller, artist Adolf Bierbrauer died, Rheinische Post, 1 December 2012
- Robert Schmitt, The Healing as an artist, Martin Leyer-Pritzkow provides Adolf Bierbrauer's life work in the town house gallery before, Schwabacher Tageblatt, 30 March 2012
- Sabine Schuchart, trance and dream worlds, German Medical Journal, Vol 107, Issue 27, 4 July 2010
- Katja Knicker, The Artist as a healer, Adolf Bierbrauer's hypnosis pictures, master's thesis to obtain the degree of Master of Arts Faculty of Philosophy, Heinrich-Heine-University Duesseldorf, Jan
- Bertram Müller, Adolf Bierbrauer – Lord of the colors, Rheinische Post, 13 October 2008 uary 2010 (3)
- Ursula Posny, a question of dignity, Neue Rhein-Ruhr Zeitung, 7 October 2006 (2)
- Klaus Sebastian, messages from the subconscious, Rheinische Post, 29 January 2003
- Rudolf Heinz, editors, pathognomonic Studies, VIII, importune philosophy recourse to psychoanalysis, p 47, approximations to Adolf Bierbrauer's "hypnosis images", Vol 32, The Blue Owl Verlag, Essen 2003, ISBN 3-89924-065-0
- Rudolf Heinz, editors, pathognomonic Studies, VII, texts for a Philosophy Psychoanalysis Finals, S.113ff., IV How hypnosis images are to be interpreted, Vol 31, The Blue Owl Verlag, Essen 2002, ISBN 3-89206-016-9
- Helga Master, With 85 years discovered West German newspaper, 29 January 2000
- Bazon Brock, Collected Writings 1991–2002, Vol III, The Barbarian as a cultural hero, aesthetics of omission, IV strategies of aesthetics, visual science, 8, incorporation and representation, pp. 465 ff, DuMont Literatur und Kunst Verlag, Cologne 2002, ISBN 3-8321-7149-5 (5)
- Heath Ines Willner, The end of my biography must lead into the future, Rheinische Post, 12 April 1994
