= Young Figuratives =

Young Figuratives was the title of two exhibitions of new contemporary art by young German painters. This first exhibition was shown under this heading in 2001 in the Carolinen Palais in Munich (Germany). The same exhibition was presented at the Museum Mönchehaus Goslar (Germany) in 2002. Both exhibitions were curated by Martin Leyer-Pritzkow.

== New figurative painting ==
The artists featured in these exhibitions blurred the historical distinction between abstract and figurative painting. Human figures, landscapes, plants, figures, interior/exterior spaces were combined in non-representational landscapes. All forms of expression, visual languages or art historical quotations were incorporated into their work. Christoph Zuschlag, a German art historian expressed in his text about the Young Figuratives: "...the ideological trench struggles to figuration and abstraction, which divided the art scene in the post-war period into two hostile camps, is now regarded as well as outdated as the picturesque tendencies of the 60s and 70s. This means that the painter today - no longer under constant pressure to justify - especially after the reunification with former East Germany, where painting had its leadership never lost and that a figurative painter is no longer automatically opposing abstraction. This in turn liberates the young figuratives: freedom of synthesis .... They have the freedom to own, for example, the characteristic of the Informal resolution of the classical principle of form and make it useful for their own paintings, even and especially when they themselves work figurative."[2]

== Participating Artists ==
- Armin Baumgarten
- Woytek Berowski
- Hans-Jörg Holubitschka
- Peter Lindenberg
- Oliver Lochau
- Bernard Lokai
- Stefan Schwarzmüller
- Benjamin Nachtwey
- Katrin Roeber

== Edition Young Figuratives by Mönchehaus Museum ==
At the opening of the exhibition in 2002 an offset print edition of nine works by all participating artists entitled "Young Figurative - Mönchehaus Museum of Modern Art 2002" were made available with an edition of 90 copies.[3]
