= Jårg Geismar =

German artist (1958–2019)

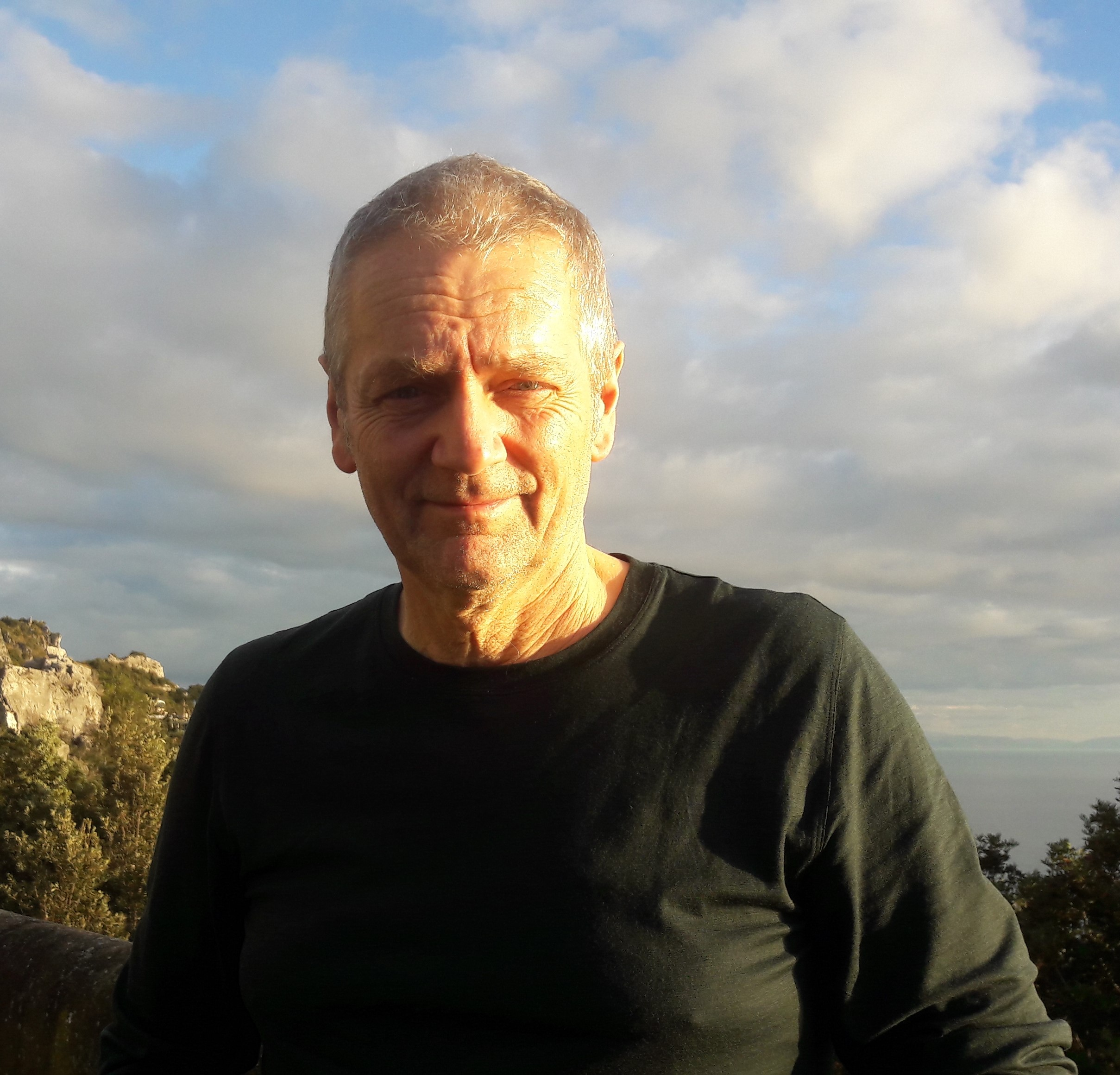
Jårg Geismar in 2018

Jårg Geismar (born 19 January 1958 in Burgsvik, Gotland, Sweden), († February 26, 2019, Essen, Germany) was a German artist. He lived and worked in Düsseldorf.

== Life ==
Geismar studied from 1979 to 1980 at the Justus-Liebig Universität in Giessen and at the Ruhr University Bochum. He was interested in the topics of animation, drawing, psychology and sociology. From 1980 to 1986, he studied at the Kunstakademie Düsseldorf at Fritz Schwegler and Irmin Kamp. In the following years 1986 to 1988, he studied at the New School of Social Research and at the Parsons School of Design in New York City. His teachers were, inter alia, Richard van Buren and Ronald Bladen. His main areas in New York were fine arts, art history and architecture with the conclusion MFA (Master of Fine Arts).

As early as 1985, he founded A.T.W. – Around the world (30) – a global forum for interdisciplinary exchange. Since then he has worked internationally on numerous projects and symposia together with authors, scientists, artists, dancers and musicians. Since 1995, he has been a lecturer and visiting professor at various colleges and art schools in Europe, Asia and the United States.

== Work ==
The work of Jårg Geismar reaches out from the painting, on installations, video art and collaborative projects with artists from different sectors. For him, all materials and objects are used to turn them into art.

"There is a very down to-earth, do-it-yourself aesthetics at play in the works of Geismar, an elegant performance refreshing in a world dominated by the values of money, bling and all of the materialistic accoutrements of our time. These works could be so fleeting that nothing more than a strong gust of wind could completely dispere with an institution's worth of art. The efforts of Geismar are very much of the ilk inherent in the sentiment of Jasper Johns: to take an object, do something else. The context of Geismar's efforts are less to be seen in galleries than in public spaces, as this is a very open and generous art form, to be embraced from the mind and heart instead from the wallet alone." Kenny Schachter in "The Red Line".. (1a)

== Awards (selection) ==
- 1986 DAAD scholarship to New York City
- 1987 Artist Space, Grant, New York, United States
- 1990 Arts Fund, Bonn e.V., Germany
- 1990 Merit of Excellence, Kansai Science City, Japan (along with Holger Drees)
- 1993 Cartier Foundation for Contemporary Art in Jouy-en-Josas Scholarship, Paris, France
- 1996 Foundation Artist Schöppingen, Germany
- 1997–98 IASPIS scholarship, Stockholm, Sweden (36)
- 2000 AIAV scholarship Akiyoshidai, Japan (6)
- 2001 Atelier d 'Artists Fellowship, Marseille, France
- 2010 Vrije Academy Scholarship The Hague, Netherlands

== Solo exhibitions (selection) ==
- 2015 "Piccolo Cinema", Martin Leyer-Pritzkow exhibitions, Düsseldorf
- 2015 Galleri Fagerstedt, Stockholm, Sweden
- 2014 "feeling my own blood", Jiri Svestka Gallery Berlin
- 2014 "once upon a dream", TZR Galerie Kai Brückner, Düsseldorf, Germany.
- 2014 "tongue in face", C & H artspace, Amsterdam, Netherlands
- 2012 "Life in a bottle" TZR Galerie Kai Brückner, Düsseldorf
- 2011 "unpredictable", The Gallery of Fine Arts Slovenj Gradec, Slovenia (c) (1)
- 2011 "ESSENCE" C & H artspace Amsterdam, the Netherlands (c) (2)
- 2011 "at the marketplace" TZR Galerie Kai Brückner, Düsseldorf
- 2010 "accidental meeting", GEMAK Museum, The Hague, The Netherlands
- 2009 "AQUARIUM", Japanese-German Center Berlin (3) (c)
- 2008 "with love from" Gallery HAM, Nagoya, Japan
- 2008 "by chance", Gallery Hashimoto, Tokyo, Japan
- 2007 "nothing fits, everything goes," Jiri Svestka Gallery in Prague, Czech Republic
- 2007 "PHANTASY", TZR Galerie Kai Brückner, Düsseldorf
- 2005 "Lost in Tokyo, lost in Berlin", ART, Tokyo, Japan
- 2004 "daydreaming" Jiri Svestka Gallery, Prague, Tsechische Republic
- 2004 "ignorance is the fantasy of knowledge", Galerie Gabriele Rivet, Cologne
- 2003 "The Optimists" Liljevalchs Konsthall, Stockholm, Sweden (c) (4)
- 2002 "SILENCE" Märkisches Museum (Berlin), Berlin
- 2002 "without you". L.A.Galerie Lothar Albrecht, Frankfurt
- 2002 "Jag är här och min far född dog här" BAC Baltic Art Center, Visby, Sweden, (c) (5)
- 2000 'WE MEET IN ::: "The Yamaguchi Prefectural Art Museum, Yamaguchi, and AIAV, Yamaguchi, Japan (c) (6)
- 1999 'Future in Mind" National Gallery Bangkok, Thailand (c) (7)
- 1998 'BUDGET' Kunsthalle Gothenburg, Sweden (c) (8)
- 1997 "BUDGET" Kunsthalle Kiel, Kiel, Germany (c) (9)
- 1997 'WOMEN, MEN, CHILDREN AND DOGS "IASPIS and Fylkingen, Stockholm, Sweden (36)
- 1995 'Bloody Mary ", Förderkoje Art Cologne, Rivet Gallery Cologne, Germany
- 1994 'PUBLIC COPYRIGHT ", Art Association of the Rhineland and Westphalia, Düsseldorf (c) (10)
- 1994 'parience is wisdom ", branch Basel, Switzerland (c)
- 1992 'CABLES ", Galerie Gabriele Rivet, Cologne
- 1991 'Clothes Make People ", Exhibit Space Sagacho, Tokyo, Japan (c) (11)
- 1991 'VESPA "Espai 13, Fundació Joan Miró, Barcelona, Spain (c) (39)
- 1991 'Money money come to me, "Avtosavodska Hall, Moscow, Russia
- 1991 "WELCOME", Kenny Schachter, New York City, United States
- 1990 "PHILIPS" De Fabriek, Eindhoven, Netherlands (c)
- 1990 "DIAMONDS", Sandra Gering Gallery, New York, USA (c)
- 1989 "FUTURE IS BASED ON TRUST", Littmann Gallery, Basel, Switzerland (c) (12)

== Group exhibitions (selection) ==
- 2013 'LE PONT "MAC, Contemporary Art Museum and Marseille European Capital of Culture Marseille-Provence, Marseille, France Curator: Thierry Ollat; et al with Marina Abramovic, Absalon, Vito Acconci, Denis Adams, Francis Alys, Jean-Michel Basquiat, Chen Zhen, Marlene Dumas, Jimmie Durham, Peter Friedel, Felix Gonzales -Torres, Mona Hatoum, Douglas Gordon, Pierre Huyghe, Alfredo Jaar, Ilya Kabakov, Emilia Kabakov, William Kentridge, Kimsooja, Roman Ondak, Gabriel Orozco, Adrian Paci, Dan Perjovschi, Anri Sale, Yinka Shonibare, Andy Warhol, Fiona Tan, Beat Streuli, Lazlo Moholy-Nagy, Barthelemy Toguo, Guido van der Werve (38)
- 2013 "THE COLLECTOR", Art Museum Uppsala, Sweden curators Elisabeth Fagerstedt and Åsa Thor Lund, including Magnus Bärtås, Annika Erikson, Hyun-Jin Kwak, Charles LaBelle, Matt Leiderstam (c) (13)
- 2008 "ITCA Triennial," The National Gallery Prague, Tsechische Republic Curator: Hiroshi Minamishima (c) (14)
- 2007 "T / space (a) * 68 ', 2007, halls Belfort, Brugge, Belgium; Curators: Michel de Wilde, Stef van Bellingen; et al. with Marcel Broodthaers, Jeff Cornelis, Daniel Dewale, Jef Gey, Felix Gmelin, Pablo Lafuente, Gianni Motti, Erwin Wurm, inter alia, in the video DVD interviews with Harun Farocki, Jan Debbaut, Christian Heise, Ben Borthwick, Iwona Blazwick, Hans-Ulrich Obrist, Julie Espeel, Ugo Dossi. (15) (c)
- 2007 "Attitude 2007", CAMK Contemporary Art Museum Kumamoto, Kumamoto, Japan; Curator Hiroshi Minamishima; et al. with Nobuyoshi Araki, Boris Mikhailov, Leonid Sokov, Rasa Todosijevic, Judy Chicago, Miwa Yanagi, Zbigniew Liberia. (16) (c)
- 2007 "The Art of Collecting", Museum Kunst Palast, Düsseldorf (c)
- 2006 "Class Kamp 1974-2006", Kunsthalle Düsseldorf, including Christoph Büchel, Luka Fineisen, Maik and Dirk Löbbert, Dieter Lennartz, Heike Pallanca, Takashi Kuibayashi, Birgit Werres, Axel Lieber et al. (17) (c)
- 2005 "flipbook", Kunsthalle Düsseldorf and Fotomuseum Provincie Antwerpen, Belgium
- (2006) Curator: Daniel Gethmann / Christoph Schulz; with 110 international artists, (18) (c)
- 2004 "Conceptual Clothing", Musashino Library Museum and Kirishima Open Air Museum, Japan * (2005), curator:. Kazuko Koike, inter alia, with Yayoi Kusama, Issey Miyake, Yasumasa Morimura, Lucy Orta, Kosuke Tsumura (c) (19)
- 2002 "Transfer" Photo Museum Umeå, Sweden, curator Jan-Erik Lundström, including with Batholomeo Togue, Annee Olofsson, Ingrid Falk & Gustavo Aguerre.
- 2001 '. Tirana Biennale Escape 1 ", Tirana, Albania, curated by Jan-Erik Lundström (20) (c)
- 2001 'Cabinet of drawing "Art Association of the Rhineland and Westphalia, Düsseldorf, Kunstverein Lingen Kunsthalle, Chemnitz Art Gallery, Kunstverein Stuttgart, (21) (c)
- 2000 'Less Aesthetics more ethics ", participants of the 7th Architecture Biennale di Venezia, Italian Swiss pavilion; Curator: Harm Lux (c) (22)
- 1998 'ARKIPELAG "Cultural Capital of Europe, Stockholm, Sweden Curator: David Neuman, in section 2, inter alia, Miriam Bäckström with Tobias Rehberger, Andrea Zittel, Jason Rhoades, Carsten Nicolai, Chen Zhen, Nari Ward, Sigmar Polke, Federle (c) (23)
- 1998 'Medialization "Edsvik Const culture, Sollentuna Sweden and Kunstimuuseum Eesti, Tallinn, Estonia; Curator: Joseph brick; et al Frederic Wretman, CM von Haus Wolf, Eija-Liisa Ahtila, Eva Koch, Dellbrügge & Moll, Zbigniew Libera, Oleg Kulik, AES, Peter Kogler, IRWIN, Nedkov Solakov, Uri Tzaig, Kendell Geers, Soo-ja Kim, Andres Serrano, (c)
- 1996 'Multimedia Squared ", Lansdowne House, London, England; et al. with Arni Gudmundson, Sadachiko Odashima, Cecilia Parsberg, Tom Phillips, Colin Self, Ben Vautier, Darrel Viner and Peter Greenaway, curator: Robert Connolly (c)
- 1996 'Dialogues "Atatürk Kültüt Merkezi and Museum Kunst Palast Düsseldorf, artists, among others with Erdag Aksel, Ezra Bergersen, Eberhard Bosslet, Felix and Irmel Droese, Ernst Hesse, Julia Lohmann, Osman, Thomas Schütte, Yuji Takeoka, Iskender Yediler, Adem Yilmaz, Paul Pozozza Museum, Curator: Beral Madra and Ernst Hesse (c)
- 1997 'Arctic - Antarctic "Art and Exhibition Hall of the Federal Republic of Germany, Bonn, (c) (24) curator Stephan Andreae, Arved Fuchs, Sven Lundström,
- 1994 "love stories", House of World Cultures, Berlin; u.a.mit Collette, Dirk summer, Mercedes Barros. (c)
- 1994 'Body of gender ", Center for Contemporary Art in Linz, Austria, including with Valie Export, Vera Frenkel, Piotr Nathan, Joanna Jones, Ilse Haider (c) (25) Curator: Sigrid Schade
- 1993 'Cardinal Points of Art ", participants of the 45th Venice Biennale, Turkish pavilion; Beral Madra Curator, Italy (c) (26)
- 1992 'Adam and Eve', The National Museum of Modern Art, Saitama, Japan in the section "Distance" and others with Man Ray, Marcel Duchamp, Yasumasa Morimura, Robert Longo, Eiko Hosoe, Cindy Sherman, Genieve Cadieux, Jürgen Klauke, Ulay / Abramović, Jiri Takamatsu, Leiko Ikemura (c) (32)
- 1992 'Sites of Intolerance ", The Institute of Contemporary Art, MoMA PS1, New York, USA; et al Gretchen Bender, Peter Fend, Scott Gilliam, Catherine carts Berg, Catherine Owens, Dara Silverman; (c) (37) Curator: Zdenka Gabulova
- 1991 'Exposition de L'ecole du Magasin "Centre National d'Art Contemporain de Grenoble, Grenoble, France classi, uamit Michel Aubry, Perejaume, Andreas Slominski, Richard Venlet, Bernard Voita (2c) (28)
- 1990 "greenhouse V", Museum Kunst Palast, Düsseldorf, including Annette from the Bey, Ursula Damm, Dag Erik Elgin, Manuel Franke, Till scorn, Detlef Holt Grewe, Ulrike Holthöfer, Klaus sweeping forest, Susanne Klaner, Bertolt Mohr, Martin Schwenk (c) (27) Curator: Stefan Wiese
- 1990 "Color and / or Monochrome", The National Museum of Modern Art, Kyoto, Japan, among others Katharina Fritsch, Leiko Ikemura, Wolfgang Laib, Mark Tansey, Noriyuki Haraguchi. (c) (29)
- 1989 'Les Trois I "piece dyeing Basel, Switzerland, among others Mario Merz, Ulrich back Riehm, Dieter Roth, Vittorio Messina, DSR, Corsin Fontana, Franka Hörnschemeyer, Sander Dörbecker, Min Tanaka, Frank Kölges (c) Curators: Klaus Littmann and Gabriele Rivet
- 1989 'special exhibition Art Basel "Art Basel 1989 with Reiner Ruth Beck, Franka Hörnschemeyer, Jim Whiting, Vittorio Messina; Curators: Klaus Littmann and Gabriele Rivet
- 1989 'Color and / or Monochrome ", The National Museum of Modern Art, Tokyo, Japan; Curators: Ichikawa, Masanori / Matsumoto, Tohru; et al. Katharina Fritsch, Leiko Ikemura, Wolfgang Laib, Mark Tansey, Noriyuki Haraguchi. (c)
- 1988 '200-1' Shakespeare Köln, Adem Yilmaz curator; Guillaume Bijl, Michael Buthe, Bernh. Joh. Flower, Sigmar Polke, Magdalene Jetolova, Adem Yilmaz, Christian Sery, Theo Lambertin, Wolfgang Luy, Peter Mönig, Mic Enneper, Georg Herold, Cologne (31)
- 1988 "Sunrise Highway" John Gibbson Gallery, New York, USA; et al. with Cady Noland, Matthew McCaslin, Tom Ward
- 1986 'location Düsseldorf ", Kunsthalle Düsseldorf, Düsseldorf, curators: Jürgen Harten, Marie Luise Syring and Hans-Werner Schmidt; et al with Gereon Lepper, Wilhelm Mundt, Chris Reinecke, Klaus Ritter Busch and Thomas Struth (c) (33)
- 1986 'unbalanced', Kölnischer Kunstverein, Cologne; curated by Ingo cumin; et al Elisabeth Jappe, Kasper König, Herbert Olderings, Karl Ruhrberg, Manfred worm burgers and Dietmar Schneider with Julius, Guillaume Bijl, Al Hansen, Frank Kölges, Graubner. (c) (34)
- 1985 "Class Kamp", Museum Kunst Palast, Düsseldorf (c)
- 1983 'The latest craze "Hetjens Museum / Art Museum Düsseldorf, curator Stefan Wiese; et al with Joseph Beuys, Abraham David Christian, Bertram Jesdinsky, Meuser, Reiner Ruth Beck, Halina Jaworski. (c) (35)

== Works in public collections (selection) ==
- MAC Contemporary Art Museum Marseille, France
- Uppsala Konstmuseum, UppsalaSchweden
- The Yamaguchi Prefectural Museum of Art, Yamaguchi, Japan
- CAMK Contemporary Art Museum Kumamoto, Kumamoto, Japan
- The Library Museum Musashino, Tokyo, Japan
- Konstmuseum Uppsala, Sweden
- JDZB, Japanese-German Center Berlin, Berlin
- Hetjens Museum, Düsseldorf
- Bagel, Düsseldorf
- Artists Museum Lodz, Poland

== Literature (selection) ==
- The red line. Jårg Geismar. Hatje Cantz, Stuttgart 2013, ISBN 978-3-7757-3633-6. (1a)
- Uppsala Konstmuseum (eds.): The collector. Uppsala Konstmuseum, 2012 ISBN 978-91-978807-6-3.
- Nepredvidljivo. Koroško galerija LIKOVNIH umetnosti, Slovenj Gradec 2010 ISBN 978-961-6827-01-0.
- Cosimo Ricatto (ed.): Jårg Geismar: essence. C & H artspace, Amsterdam 2011 ISBN 978-90-815987-3-6.
- Coup de ville: Sint-Niklaas 11/09/2010 - 24/10/2010. Lannoo, Tielt 2010 ISBN 978-90-209-9340-0.
- Ivan Hartmann et al (eds.). International Triennale of Contemporary Art Kant Verlag, 2008, ISBN 978-80-86970-65-3.

== Itemization (selection) ==
- 1988 Schmidt, Hans-Werner. "Geismar Made in USA", APEX, Cologne, Germany
- 1989 Raap, Jurgen. "Jårg Geismar" Art Forum International, Cologne, Germany
- 1991 plug, Raimund. "To chased the earth (ATW)," Frankfurter Allgemeine Zeitung, Frankfurt
- 1994 Goodrow, Gerard. "Jårg Geismar: Public and Private" Art News, New York
- 1995 Dziewior, Yilmaz. "To whom it may concern, Jårg Geismar ... Texte zur Kunst, Cologne
- 1995 Jocks, Heinz-Norbert. "Short Cuts a city" West German newspaper, Düsseldorf
- 1996 Milkers, Anne. "Rivet te maken met 'Jeannine,'" De Morgen, Brussels, Belgium
- 1997 Krajewski, Michael. "Jårg Geismar at the Kunsthalle," Art Bulletin, Schweitz
- 1997 Rubin, Brigitta, "Const Ulvskog om", Dagens Nyheter, Stockholm, Sweden
- 1998 Rönnau, Jens. "I'm trying the energy of the society in the art with reinzubringen" Art Forum International, Volume 139, Cologne
- 1998 Type of test, Catarina. "Communication cable for" Göteborgsposten, Gothenburg, Sweden
- 1998 Birnbaum, Daniel. "Interview at Artnode" Artnode, Stockholm, Sweden
- 1999 Teeratada, Pratarn. "Jårg Geismar," art4d, Bangkok, Thailand
- 2000 Kobayashi, Kiyoto. "Duality of the cable," Yomiuri Shinbun, Fukuoka 15.3.2000
- 2001 Neumaier, Otto. "Querweltein" frame, Vienna, Austria
- 2003 Olofsson, Anders. "Jårg Geismar The Optimists ..." Konstperspektiv, Stockholm
- 2003 Raap, Jurgen. "Jårg Geismar" Art Forum International Band 165, Bonn
- 2003 Paolo Bianchi. "Garbage Cans" Art Forum International Band 167, Bonn
- 2005 bird Sabiene. "daydreaming" Artforum International, New York
- 2006 Thor Lund, Åsa. "Betraktarpositioner och det teatralika" text about the position of the viewer and the theatrical production as performative in artworks by Rafael Lozano Hemmer, Jårg Geismar and Yoko Ono, Uppsala University, Uppsala, Sweden.
- 2006 Neumaier, Otto. "Communication with non-Communic ...", frame no. 18, 19, Vienna
- 2007 Marko Golub "Jarg Geismar u Galeriji proširenih medija" Likovnost, Zagreb, Croatia
- 2008 Galloway, David. "Jårg Geismar" ARTnews, New York,
- 2008 Larking, Matthew. "Jårg Geismar," The Japanese Times, Tokyo
- 2012 Rönnau, Jens. "The Flowers of strangers" Art Forum tape 216, Germany
- 2013 Haase, amines. "Focus on France" Art Forum International Band 223, Bonn
- 2013 Kesenne, Joannes. "Jårg Geismar, 'THE RED LINE' hard '117, Belgium
- 2014 Nitulescu, Mary. "Interview with Jårg Geismar" Positive in Berlin, Berlin
- 2015 Müller, Bertram. " In Düsseldorf is alles ein bisschen zu brav ( Düsseldorf is a little to well-behaved), Rheinische Post, p. C3, 02.19.2015, (40)
