= Hans-Jörg Holubitschka =

German painter

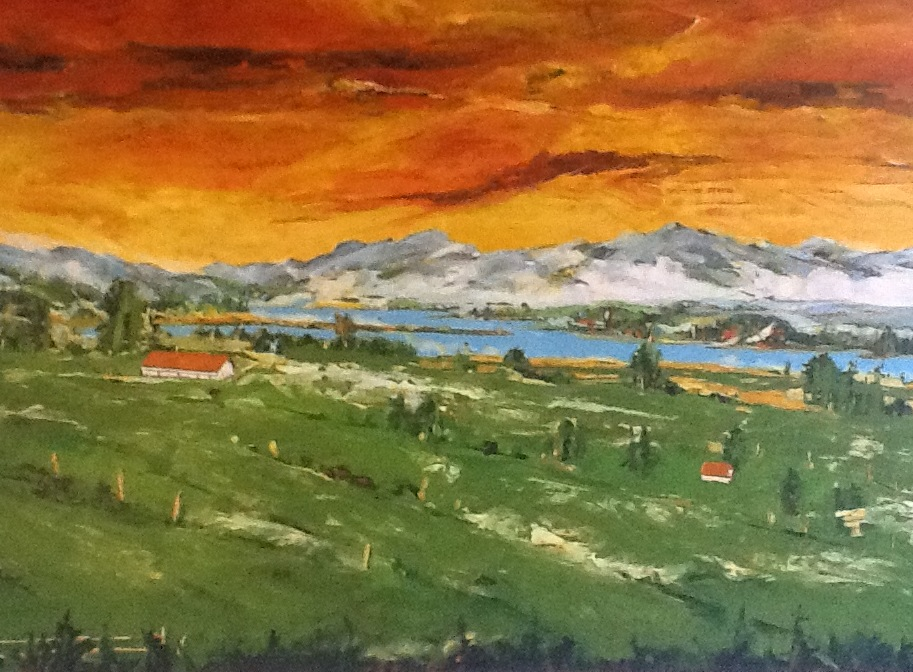
Hans-Jörg Holubitschka, Chiemsee, Oil on Canvas, 130 cm x 160cm, 1999

Hans-Jörg Holubitschka (born 29 July 1960 in Seltzer, Westerwald - 16 December 2016 in Düsseldorf) was a German painter. He studied at the Kunstakademie Düsseldorf. Holubitschka lived and worked in Düsseldorf. At the Ruhrakademie in Schwerte he taught the subject painting.

== Life ==
After leaving school, Hans-Jörg Holubitschka went on the recommendation of his former art teacher at the high school to Düsseldorf to study from 1980 to 1988 at the Kunstakademie Düsseldorf in the class of Gerhard Richter. There he met other students, for example his fellow painter Thomas Bernstein. Other later fellow artists with whom he already be friends during the Academy times, as Stefan Demary, Heinz Hausmann, Bernard Lokai and more accompanied him on his other artistic projects.

== Work ==
After finishing his studies, Hans-Jörg Holubitschka devoted to the landscape painting. His favorite subjects are landscapes views among others in southern France, Italy, England with Scotland, Ireland, Spain, landscapes in Germany including his native Westerwald, but also the Swiss Alps and the Bavarian Alps. The "Urban Landscapes" and cityscapes, he has painted, include the following cities: Düsseldorf, Rio de Janeiro, London, Paris, Orvieto, Mallorca, Rome and Venice. From 2012 onwards, he also dealt with the theme of cultural landscape. For this purpose, it is one of the artificially designed landscapes, such as golf course landscapes. He has implemented picturesque new visual landscapes of the following places: The Fifteens (Düsseldorf Golf Club), The Seventh (Hubbelrath Golf Club), Princeville Hawaii, St Andrews Scotland, Oubaai (South Africa) and Les Dunes United States.

Hans-Jörg Holubitschka did not paint the representational quality of a landscape. The landscape was the medium for him to give the viewer a familiar motif access to its "soul pictures". He made use of color and its composition possibilities as an instrument to mental states to express. His images reflect in their color effects and excesses of the painter of the American Color Field painting like Mark Rothko, Barnet Newman or Clyfford Still. While these painters moved in perfect abstract space, it took Hans-Jörg Holubutischka, figurative elements of the landscape into abstract color fields to convert.

== Exhibitions ==
- 1990 Gallery Tabea Langenkamp, Duesseldorf
- 1995 Municipal Museum Haus Koekkoek, Kleve
- 1995 Gallery Schoettle, Munich
- 1996 Galerie Johnen & Schoettle, Cologne
- 1996 "Pintura", Castello di Rivara, Turin, Italy
- 1996 En Helvetes förvandling Engelsk-fran NRW, Stockholm, Sweden
- 1997 A different view, Andrew Mummery Gallery, London, Great Britain
- 1998 New German Painters, Martin Leyer-Pritzkow Exhibitions, Decoplage, Miami, United States of America
- 1998 Due Dimensioni, Accademia di Belle Arti di Venezia, Venice, Italy
- 1999 Andrew Mummery Gallery, London, Great britain
- 2000 Informal landscapes - scenic Informal, Martin Leyer-Pritzkow Ausstellungen, Duesseldorf, Germany
- 2000 Due Dimensioni, pescheria Nuevo, Rovigo, Italy
- 2001 Young Figuratives, including Armin Baumgarten, Peter Lindenberg, Olibver Loachau, Bernard Lokai, Stefan Müller, Katrin Roeber, Ketterer Kunst in Carolinen Palais, Munich, Germany.
- 2002 Artax art trade - Ralph Kleinsimlinghaus, Düsseldorf, Germany
- 2002 Young Figuratives, including Armin Baumgarten, Peter Lindenberg, Olibver Loachau, Bernard Lokai, Stefan Müller, Katrin Roeber, Mönchehaus - Museum of Modern Art, Goslar, Germany
- 2002 Dispute of the painters, with Armin Baumgarten, Hans-Jörg Holubitschka, Bernard Lokai, Peter Lindenberg, Stefan Müller, Katrin Roeber, Martin Leyer-Pritzkow Ausstellungen, Düsseldorf, Germany
- 2003 visions of landscape, gallery Schmalfuß, Marburg, Germany
- 2003 new positions painting gallery Wittenbrink, Munich, Germany
- 2004 Kunstverein Arnsberg, Arnsberg, Germany
- 2004 Kunstverein Ulm, Jost Münster, Germany
- 2005 Gallery CP, Wiesbaden, Germany
- 2008 Gallery Wittenbrink, Munich; Germany
- 2009 Gallery CP, Wiesbaden, Germany
- 2010 "carom"; Gallery Fellner of Feldegg, Krefeld, Germany
- 2012 New landscapes, Düsseldorf Golf Club, Düsseldorf, Germany
- 2013 Gallery of Fellnegg Fellner, with Bernard Lokai, Krefeld, Germany
- 2014 "4 auf 8" with Armin Baumgarten, Bernard Lokai and Katrin Roeber, Martin Leyer-Pritzkow Ausstellungen, Düsseldorf
- 2014 "Forbidden Colours", Martin Leyer-Pritzkow Aussstellungen, Düsseldorf
- 2014 Hans-Jörg Holubitschka, Gallery Wittenbrink, Munich
- 2016 "Olympic Landscapes", Martin Leyer-Pritzkow, Düsseldorf

== Literature ==
- (Ed.) Martin Leyer-Pritzkow: Junge Figurative (Young Figuratives) : Robert Ketterer [prolog], with contribution of Martin Leyer-Pritzkow, Christoph Zuschlag, Düsseldorf, 50 with artists: Woytek Berowski; Hans-Jörg Holubitschka; Peter Lindenberg; Oliver Lochau; Bernard Lokai; Stefan Müller; Benjamin Nachtwey; Katrin Roeber, in English and German language, 2001, ISBN 978-3000073755
- Das Kunstkaufbuch (the Art Purchase Book.): für Sammler und solche, die es werden wollen, (for collectors and others want to be), authors: Martin Leyer-Pritzkow, Klaus Sebastian. Artists: Thomas Schütte; Santiaogo Sierra; Horst Wackerbarth; Paola Pivi; Hans-Jörg Holubitschka; Musa, Hassan; ...- München; u.a. : Prestel., 63 p.: numerous coloured images, ISBN 3-7913-3359-3
- Hans-Jörg Holubitschka : die Farben von Urbino ; Landschaften 1992-2007 ; (The colours of Urbino - Landscapes 1992-2007 ) with contribution of Jens Neubert, Peter Stüber, Walter Feilchenfeldt, , Tabea Langenkamp,....Wädenswil : Nimbus Kunst und Bücher. - 103 p. Coloured images, 2008, ISBN 978-3-907142-31-8

== Video ==
- Interview from Martin Leyer-Pritzkow with Hans-Jörg Holubitschka in his art studio, autumn 2014 (German language)
