= Armin Baumgarten =

German painter and sculptor

Armin Baumgarten (born 25 September 1967 in Wolfsburg) is a German painter and sculptor.

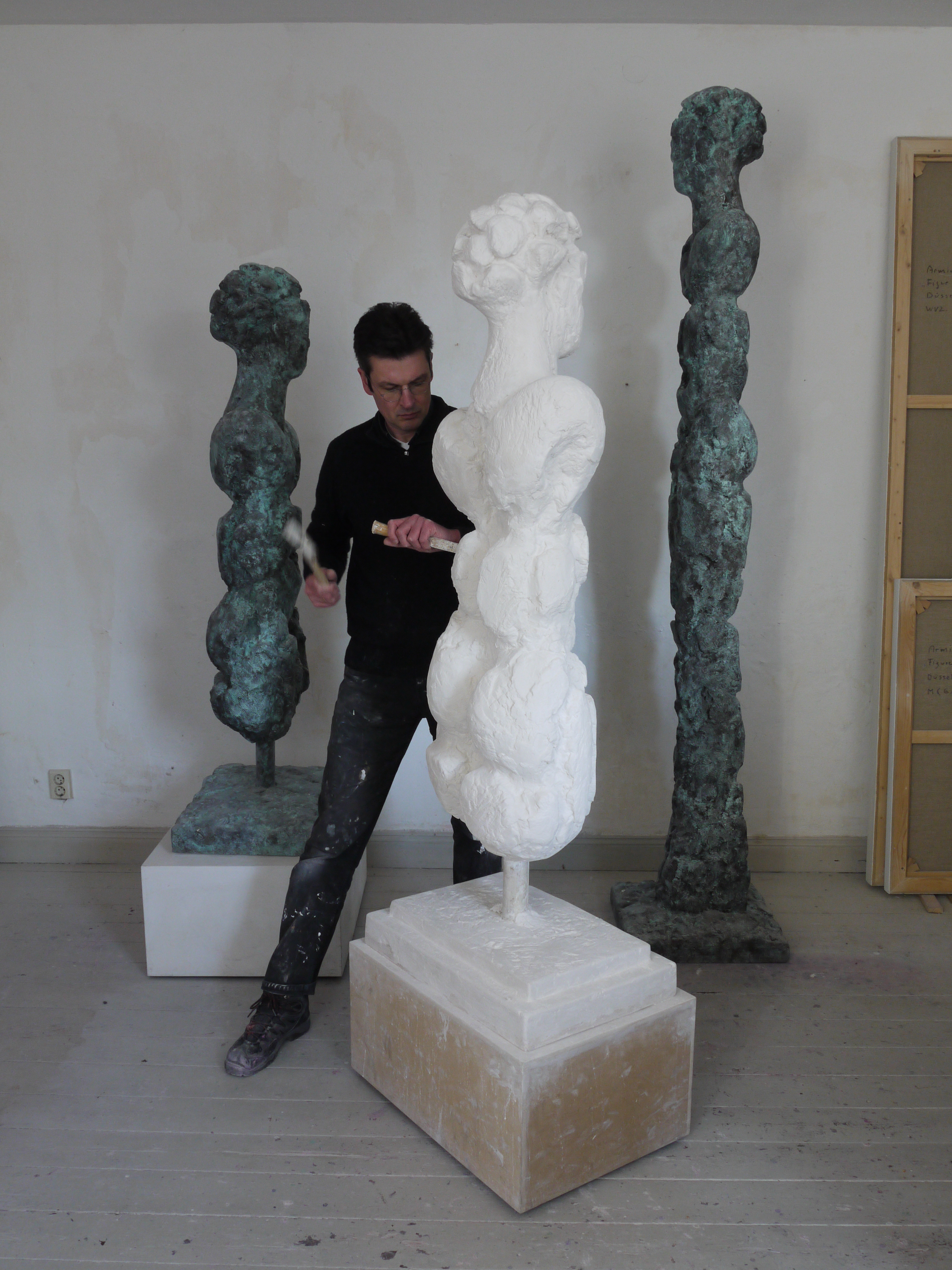
Armin Baumgarten in his art studio 2015

== Life ==
Armin Baumgarten spent his childhood in Lower Saxony and dealt early with drawing and painting, supported by his art teacher Wilfried Wöhler also with etching. After graduating from Humboldt Gymnasium in Gifhorn and alternative civilian service in Brunswick, he started there in 1989 at the Braunschweig University of Art the study of Painting. His teachers were Hinnerk Schrader, Karl Moller, D. Arwed Gorella and Hermann Albert, his master pupil in 1996 he had been. In 1995 he was a founding member of the group of painters named "convention". In 1996 he married the painter Birte Kulms. In 1997 he received a scholarship to live and work of the association Künstlerhaus Meinersen in Meinersen. In 1998 he moved to Düsseldorf. There he created next new topics in painting. From 2003 he developed also first sculptures (bronze casting). In 2007 he created a cross picture for Tersteegenkirche in Düsseldorf.

== Work ==
The works of Armin Baumgarten arise beyond the antagonism between the figurative and the abstract, i.e. this picture is not borrowed from the optical reality, but establishes itself within a picturesque charging process on the scene as a separate image reality. From the painting originally thin liquid Armin Baumgarten came to a very tactile, impasto ductus gain by the motifs a physical presence. This development process resulted since 2003 in the study of sculpture that is created first in a lengthy process of work up and ablation of gypsum and is then implemented as a bronze casting. The paintings and sculptures revolve archaic basic, essential topics such as the head, figure and figure group, countryside and mountain or tree. This image is compressed in the work process in a reduced to the essential iconic shape that is possible directly sensual and physically not only visible to the viewer, but also experienced.

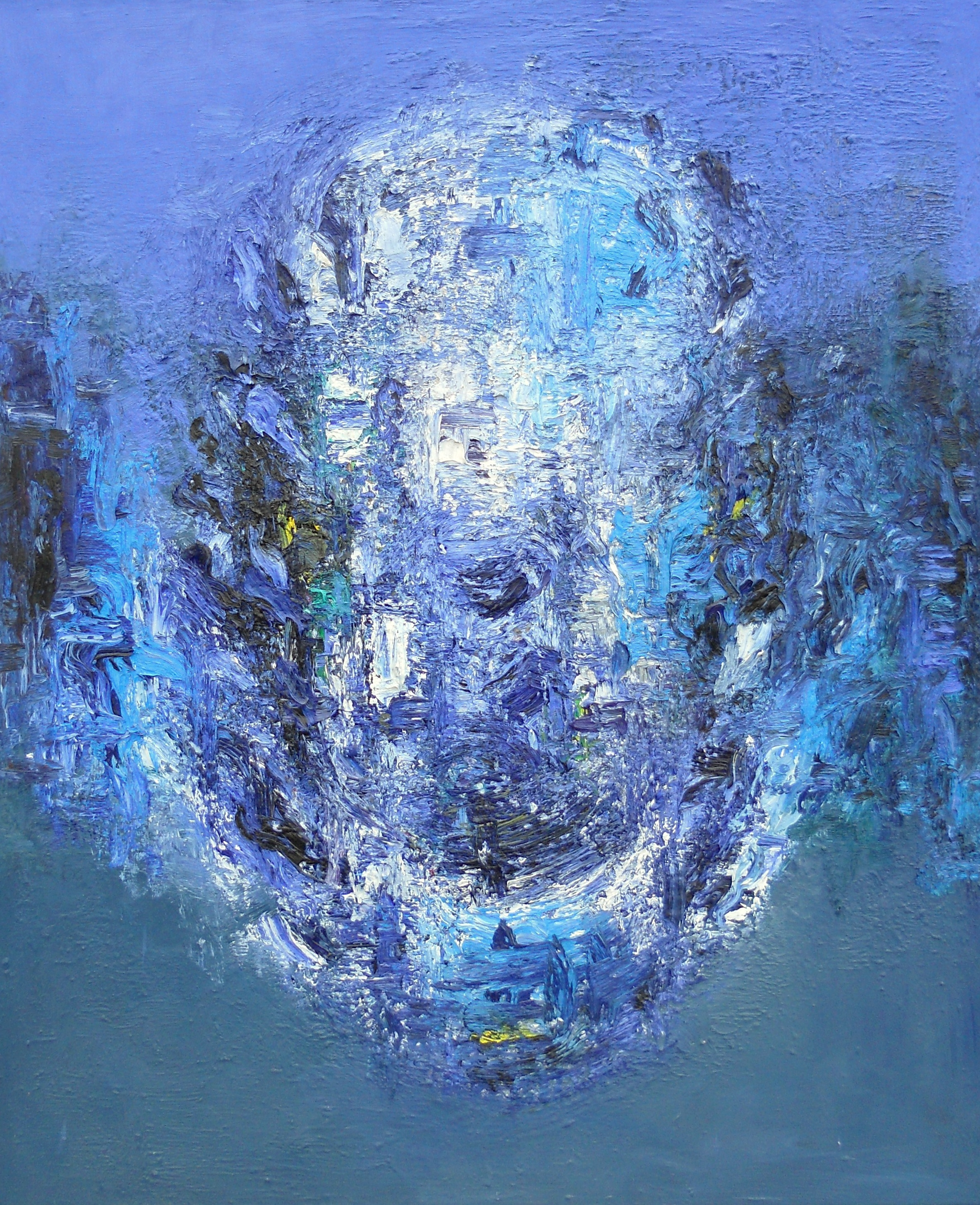
Armin Baumgarten, Kopf, 2004, Oil on canvas, 160 cm x 130 cm, 2004

== Selected exhibitions ==
- 1989 Kreismuseum Hornburg, together with Peter Lindenberg, Hornburg, Germany
- 1993 drawings, White Hall of the City Museum, Braunschweig, Germany
- 1996 Convention Kunsthalle Braunschweig, Braunschweig, Germany
- 1998 master class 96, Kunsthalle Braunschweig, Braunschweig, Germany
- 1996 Convention, the MMI Academy, Riddagshausen, Germany
- 1997 photos and drawings, Künstlerhaus Meinersen, Meinersen, Germany
- 1997 5 Exhibition to promote young artists from the Federal Republic of Germany, Gästehaus Petersberg, Königswinter, Germany
- 1997 Convention 1997, Städtische Galerie house "Eichenmüller", Lemgo, Germany
- 1998 Due Dimensioni, Giovane Arte in Italia e Germania, Accademia di Belle Arti di Venezia, Venice, Italy
- 1998 body and mind, Sport University Cologne, Germany
- 1998 Martin Leyer-Pritzkow exhibitions, Düsseldorf, Germany
- 1999 Gallery DE, Düsseldorf, Germany
- 1999 Forum for Young Art, Burscheid, Germany
- 1999 Art Multiple, Düsseldorf, Germany
- 2000 People pictures with works by Adolf Bierbrauer, Fabrizio Gazzarri, Martin Leyer – Pritzkow exhibitions, Düsseldorf, Germany
- 2000 Due Dimensioni, Giovane Arte in Italia e Germania, Il pescheria di Nuova, Rovigo, Italy
- 2000 Salon des Arts Modern, Sélection Internationale, Eupen, Belgium
- 2001 Young Figuratives, inter alia with Hans-Jörg Holubitschka, Peter Lindenberg, Oliver Lochau, Bernard Lokai, Stefan Müller (alias Stefan Schwarzmüller), Katrin Roeber, Ketterer Kunst in Carolinen Palais, Munich, Germany
- 2001 New Works, Martin Leyer-Pritzkow exhibitions, Düsseldorf, Germany
- 2001 Open Art Line, Open Art Gallery, Borken, Germany
- 2001 2ième Salon des Arts Modern, Selection International, Eupen, Belgium
- 2002 Armin Baumgarten + Stephen O'Driscoll, Winter Gallery, Wiesbaden, Germany
- 2002 head and mask Gallery Fahrenhorst, Hameln, Germany
- 2002 Young Figuratives, inter alia with Hans-Jörg Holubitschka, Peter Lindenberg, Oliver Lochau, Bernard Lokai, Stefan Müller (alias Stefan Schwarzmüller), Katrin Roeber, Mönchehaus – Museum of Modern Art, Goslar, Germany
- 2002 Gallery Frank, Munich, Germany
- 2002 Dispute of the painters, with Hans-Jörg Holubitschka, Bernard Lokai, Peter Lindenberg, Stefan Müller, Katrin Roeber, Martin Leyer – Pritzkow exhibitions, Düsseldorf, Germany
- 2003 "Villa Romana 2003", Museum Morsbroich, Leverkusen, Germany
- 2003 Armin Baumgarten, Neil Tait, Jim Delarg, Fighting Gallery, Basel, Switzerland
- 2003 Partition Project, Kaiser Hall, Burgbrohl, Germany
- 2004 New Works, Gallery Winter, Wiesbaden, Germany
- 2004 people pictures, gallery Kabuth, Gelsenkirchen, Germany
- 2004 Head, Winter Gallery, Wiesbaden, Germany
- 2004 Head -to-head, Gallery Netuschil, Darmstadt, Germany
- 2005 40 x 40, Gallery Kabuth, Gelsenkirchen, Germany
- 2005 Art Frankfurt, Winter Gallery, Frankfurt, Germany
- 2006 Ball Artist Artist Ball, Kunstverein Gelsenkirchen, Germany
- 2007 paintings and sculptures in the George Muller Foundation, Winter Gallery, Eltville, Germany
- 2007 40 x 30, Orangery Palace Benrath, Düsseldorf, Germany
- 2007 Together Art, Kunsthaus Wiesbaden, Gallery Winter, Wiesbaden, Germany
- 2008 Nature and Engineering, Royal Gallery, Stuttgart, Germany
- 2008 Painting and Sculpture, Martin Leyer – Pritzkow exhibitions, Düsseldorf, Germany
- 2008 Contemporary Art Ruhr, gallery Kabuth, Gelsenkirchen, Germany
- 2009 Paper, Winter Gallery, Wiesbaden, Germany
- 2009 Painting and Sculpture, mbf – art projects, Munich, Germany
- 2010 Painting and Sculpture, Sparkasse gallery, Schweinfurt, Germany
- 2010 Blue, Winter Gallery, Wiesbaden, Germany
- 2010 Armin Baumgarten + Matthias Ruppel, Galerie Lehnert, Mainz, Germany
- 2011 Art Karlsruhe, Winter Gallery, Karlsruhe, Germany
- 2011 Mapping the world, The Art Space, Düsseldorf, Germany
- 2012 Pictures Sculptures, Winter Gallery, Wiesbaden, Germany
- 2012 Election relationship Dresden Gallery Sybille Nütt, Dresden, Germany
- 2012 Pictures Sculptures, mbf – art projects, Munich, Germany
- 2013 painting, sculpture, architectural models, volley art gallery, Leipzig, Germany
- 2013 "Painters and Sculptors", Gallery Winter, Wiesbaden, Germany
- 2014 "poiesis" Theartspace, Düsseldorf, Germany
- 2014 "Painting and Sculpture", inter alia, with Werner Reuber, Gallery 23, Langenberg, German
- 2014 "4 auf 8" with Hans-Jörg Holubitschka, Bernard Lokai and Katrin Roeber, Martin Leyer-Pritzkow Ausstellungen, Düsseldorf
- 2015 "Wirklichkeit der Abstraktion" (Reality of the Abstraction), Martin Leyer-Pritzkow Ausstellungen, Düsseldorf
- 2016 "Painting and Sculpture", Stiftung Burg Kniphausen, Wilhelmshaven
- 2016 "Painting and Sculpture", Sparkassengalerie, Schweinfurt
