= Bernard Lokai =

German painter (born 1960)

Bernard Lokai (born 5 September 1960) is a German painter. He studied at the Kunstakademie Düsseldorf and was a student of Gerhard Richter, and part of the Young Figuratives movement. He lives and works in Düsseldorf and Berlin, Germany. In 2002 he began teaching at the Freie Kunstakademie Essen in Essen in the Department of Painting and Graphics.

== Life ==
Lokai was born on 5 September 1960 in Bohumín, Czechoslovakia. After his parents left Czechoslovakia, Bernard Lokai grew up in Düren, Germany. After finishing high school he began to study art at Kunstakademie Düsseldorf in 1982. In 1987 he finished the academy as Meisterschüler of Gerhard Richter. At the academy he met the colorfield landscape painter Hans-Jörg Holubitschka, with whom he has participated in several exhibitions as part of the exhibition serial Young Figuratives.

== Work ==
Bernard Lokai's work incorporates the gestural brushstrokes of Abstract Expressionism and the spray paint of graffiti. His "Landscape Block" works consist of multi-panelled grids composed of eighteen 12 by 16 inch panels, each painted in the studio, then combined into a grid at random.

Art critic Mara Hoberman wrote that Bernard Lokai's Landscape Blocks depict "eighteen land-, sea-, and sky-scapes in disparate styles quoting, in turn, the brushstrokes of Monet, Turner, and Richter (his teacher), among others."

== Exhibitions (selection) ==
- 2017 Galerie Fellner von Feldegg, Krefeld
- 2015 Palazzo Albrizzi, Collateralevent of the 56th. Venice Biennale
- 2015 Bernard Lokai - Neue Werke (new works), Martin Leyer-Pritzkow Ausstellungen, Düsseldorf, Germany
- 2015 hosfelt Gallery, San Francisco, USA
- 2014 "4 auf 8" with Armin Baumgarten, Hans-Jörg Holubitschka and Katrin Roeber, Martin Leyer-Pritzkow Ausstellungen, Düsseldorf
- 2012 hosfelt Gallery, San Francisco, USA
- 2010 hosfelt Gallery, New York City, USA
- 2010 Gallery Fellner of Feldegg, Krefeld
- 2010 hosfelt Gallery, San Francisco, USA
- 2007 Martin Leyer–Pritzkow Ausstellungen, Düsseldorf
- 2006 Schloss Burgau, Düren
- 2006 Martin Leyer–Pritzkow Ausstellungen, Düsseldorf
- 2005 Type fair, Cologne
- 2005 Galerie Fellner von Feldegg, Krefeld
- 2004 Gallery Fellner of Feldegg, Krefeld
- 2004 Art Fair, Cologne
- 2004 Museum Ludwig
- 2003 Martin Leyer–Pritzkow Ausstellungen, Düsseldorf
- 2003 STE 2003, Prague
- 2002 Lüriper 24, Mönchengladbach
- 2002 Airport Art, Frankfurt/M.
- 2002 Young Figuratives, inter alia with Armin Baumgarten, Hans-Jörg Holubitschka, Peter Lindenberg, Oliver Lochau, Stefan Müller (Stefan Schwarmüller ), Katrin Roeber, Mönchehaus Museum Goslar - Museum of modern and contemporary art, Curator: Martin Leyer-Pritzkow Germany
- 2002 Verdi Bildungsstätte, Kochelsee Germany
- 2001 Young Figuratives, Junge Figurative, Carolinenpalais, Ketterer München Munich
- 2001 Freie Kunstschule, Essen
- 2000 Martin Leyer-Pritzkow Ausstellungen, Düsseldorf
- 2000 Due Dimensione, Germania e Giovane arte in Italia, Deutsche Welle, Cologne
- 1999 Galerie Radke, Krefeld
- 1996 Leopold-Hoesch Museum, Düren
- 1996 Galerie Jasim, Düsseldorf
- 1996 Atrium Gallery, Krefeld
- 1994 Galerie Jasim. Düsseldorf
