= Tina Juretzek =

German painter (born 1952)

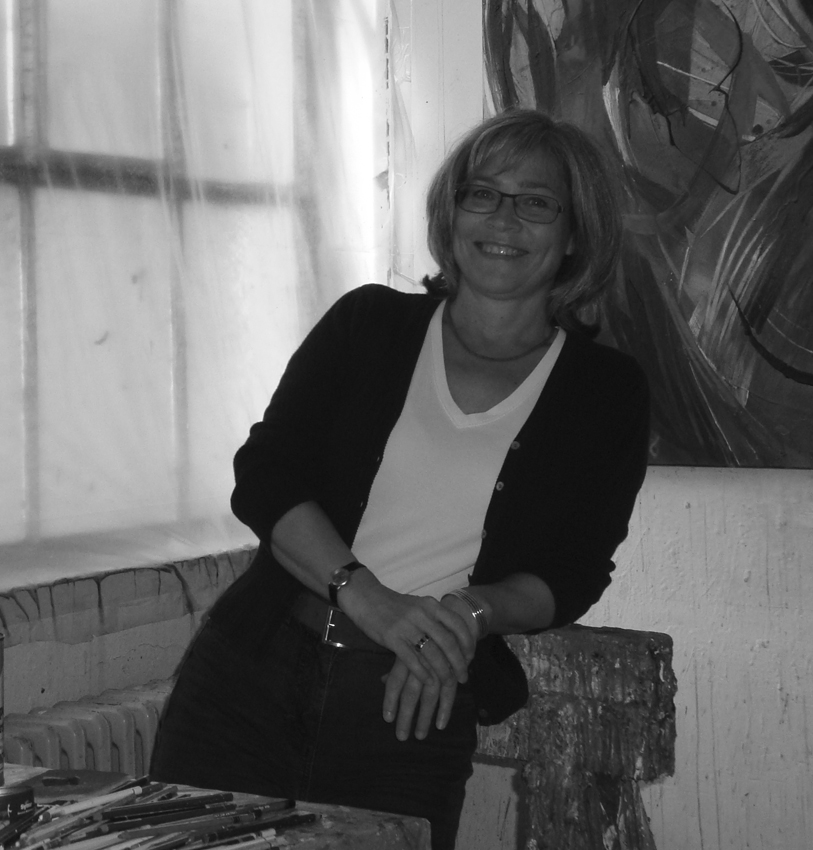
- Juretzek in 2010
- Born: 25 November 1952 (age 73); Leipzig, East Germany
- Occupation: German female painter

Tina Juretzek (born 25 November 1952 in Leipzig) is a German painter. She studied at the Kunstakademie Düsseldorf with Günter Grote and lives and works in Düsseldorf.

== Biography ==
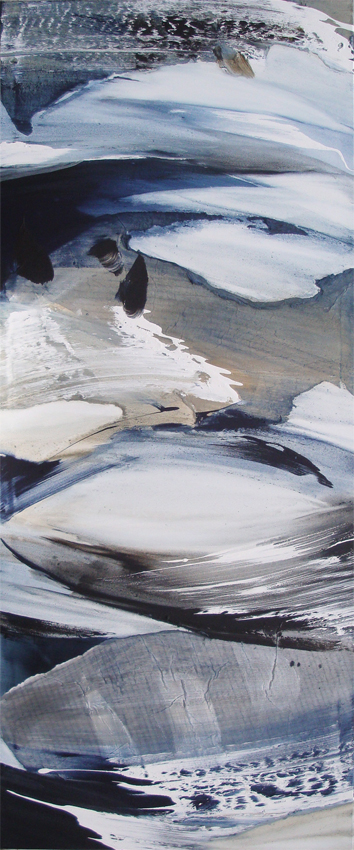
Tina Juretzek, L 2015 1, 200 cm x 85 cm, Inner Landscape, painting collage on canvas

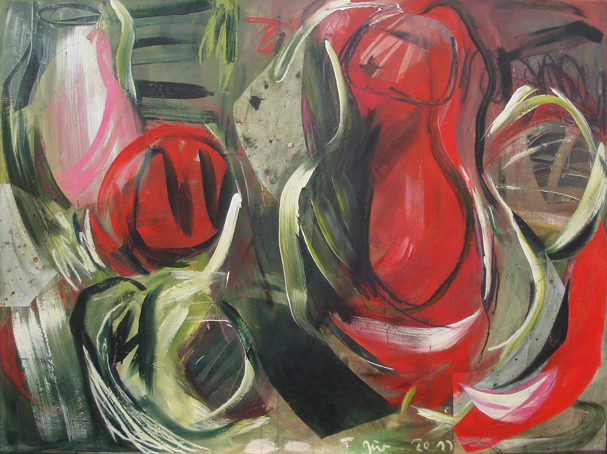
Tina Juretzel, L 2011 7, Tropical Glow, 120 cm x 160 cm, painting collage on canvas

Juretzek spent her first six years in Thale, Harz. Her mother was a sculptor, her father a merchant, her great-grandmother was an author, and her grandmother a painter. In 1958 the family escaped from the former East Germany (GDR) and moved to Essen. After her A levels in 1971 Juretzek took up her studies at the Kunstakademie Düsseldorf with Günter Grote. At the same time she studied aesthetics with Heinrich Theissing, Werner Spies and Walter Hofmann. In 1972, she began to study geography at the University of Düsseldorf focussing on physical geography. Her artistic work, painted on Japanese paper since 1991, reflects this interest.

Since 1979, Juretzek has been working as a freelance painter in Düsseldorf. Her work has been exhibited in numerous single and group exhibitions in galleries and museums. Of particular importance are her many years of intensive cooperation with the gallery Elke and Werner Zimmer in Düsseldorf. It were the Zimmers who presented Juretzek's work at quite an early stage of her artistic career in single exhibitions and continued to do so until 2000 when they closed their gallery.

Travels were of prime and initiating importance for the artist's work (India, USSR, Japan, South America, USA) In 1983, she traveled to the Lipari islands stopping on the active volcano Stromboli, where she stayed for some time and which inspired her to start an extensive line of work. It was after this journey that she began working in pen-and-ink. In 1985, she traveled from Moscow to Khabarovsk by the Trans-Siberian Railway. The journey covering 8,530 kilometers later found expression in the works World Landscapes, Night Journey and wheel and rail. This journey inspired her to work on extremely long frieze paintings. In 2004, she traveled to southern England and visited Stonehenge, which inspired that her series Ancient Sites (Sacred Mountains and places of power).

In 1999 and 2000 Juretzek's work was shown in a retrospective exhibition tour organized by the Pfalzgalerie Kaiserslautern, the Märkisches Museum Witten, the Heidelberger Kunstverein, the Städtische Galerie Gladbeck and the Stätisches Museum Mülheim an der Ruhr. In 2010, after having worked in the center of Düsseldorf for 26 years Juretzek moved her studio to the outskirts of the city.

== Work ==
Juretzek's work is characterized by abstraction in the depiction of figures and landscapes. In this respect, the object always remains perceptible despite its strong abstraction. Thus, in the 80s Juretzek created her first large figurative paintings, focussing on the relationship between human figure and space. Later she used vessels as metaphors for human beings and she employed the motive of the source to symbolize life. It was the first time that in these large-format works of art the painter made use of technique combining painting and collage.

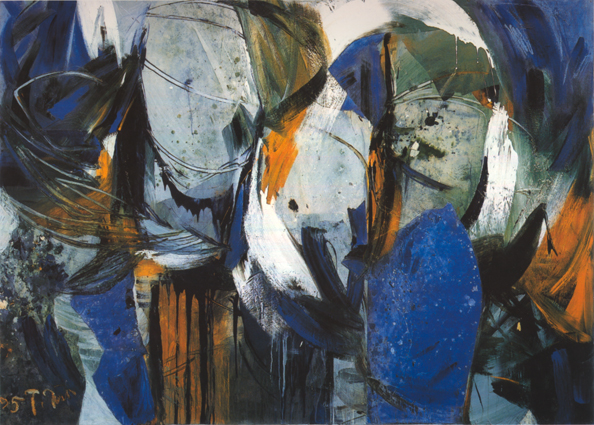
Tina Juretzek, Die Glasschmelze (The Molten Glass) 1995, 180 cm x 252 cm, painting collage on canvas

Juretzek's journey to Japan in 1991 inspired her to introduce a new line of work produced on Japanese paper. The artist turned to the theme of landscape and created a range of paintings in which she combined painting and collage with Japanese paper on canvas. In these paintings revealing inner experience and scenic associations, Jurtzek created a new relation between color, light and space, exceeding the boundaries of informal painting.

The third line of works is composed of Juretzek's extensive thematic series of drawings. A journey to the Lipari Islands in the early 1980s, inspired the painter to create ink drawings (Stromboli, Lilith, barrier landscapes, and others), the technique of which she has been using until today. In addition, Juretzek carried out numerous public commissions, such as the World Travel frieze of 1988 covering a length of 24 metres at the Federal Office Cologne-Chorweiler.

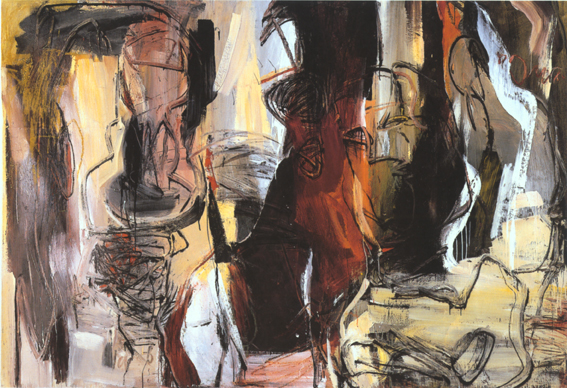
Tina Juretzek, Das Glühen (The Glow)1987, 165 cm x 242 cm, painting collage on canvas

== See also ==
- List of German women artists
