= Driss Ouadahi =

Algerian painter and architect

- Born: January 1, 1959 (age 66); Casablanca
- Occupations: Painter; Architect

Driss Ouadahi (born 1959 in Casablanca, Morocco) is a contemporary Algerian painter and architect who trained, works, and lives in Düsseldorf, Germany. Ouadahi's work features abstracted architectural forms found in real Algerian housing structures. Themes in Ouadahi's works surround politics of class, religion, and ethnicity relating to ideas of boundaries and otherness. Systeme der Abgrenzung (Systems of Demarcation), opened at the Heydt Museum in Germany on February 25, 2018

== Education ==
- Kunstakademie, Düsseldorf (1988–1994)
- École Supérieure des Beaux-Arts, Algiers (1984–1987)
- Architectural Study, Algiers (1979–1982)

== Public Collections ==
Ouadahi's works are included in the publication collections of Barjeel Art Foundation (Sharjah, UAE), FRAC Centre (Orléans, France), Herbert-Weisenburger-Stiftung (Rastatt, Germany), Kamel Lazaar Foundation (Geneva, Switzerland), Kunstmuseum Düsseldorf (Germany), Nadour Collection (Germany), Stadtsparkasses Baden-Baden (Germany)

== Awards ==
- Grand Prix Léopold Sédar SENGHOR, Dakar, Senegal (2014)
- Cité International de Arts Paris, (Verein der Düsseldorfer Künstler) (2013)
- Artist Residency, Etaneno Museum im Busch, Namibia (2011)
- Centre d'Art Contemporain, Istres, Marseille (2003)

== Publications ==
1. "Driss Ouadahi, Systeme Der Abgrenzung." Von Der Heydt Kunsthalle Wuppertal-Barmen. 2018.
2. "Driss Ouadahi Takes on Fences in Latest Exhibit." San Francisco Chronicle. (Jul. 13, 2016).
3. "Driss Ouadahi, 'Breach in the Silence' at Hosfelt Gallery.' Art Enthusiast. (Aug. 4, 2016).
4. "Driss Ouadahi: Meeting with an International Style Painter." Global Art Daily. (Nov. 14, 2014).
5. Viladas, Pilar. "Now Showing: Driss Ouadahi". The New York Times Style Magazine. (Oct. 1, 2010)
6. Levin, Kim. "Gridded Tyrannies," Catalog Essay from Driss Ouadahi: Densité. (Hosfelt Gallery, New York). 2010.
