= Thyra Schmidt =

German artist

Thyra Schmidt is a German visual artist.

== Life and work ==
In her work, Schmidt combines photographic and film techniques with predominately self written texts and develops installations for indoor and outdoor spaces. "They are interpersonal events, often based on personal experience, which she reflects in a poetically constructed manner."

At invitation by the Norwegian Goethe-Institut, Schmidt realized the art project I can't just be nowhere in the city center of Oslo, Norway, in 2009. "The title I can't just be nowhere speaks to the character of the Oslo installation in the public space and refers to the essentials in Schmidt’s work, namely the presence of the human figure, the particular moment and the relationship to the location. The photos and expressions that were projected on posters on buildings often related closely to the architectural context. They are large format photographic and text works with privately looking themes and are positioned onto various exterior surfaces of houses, public buildings or shops. This connected installation, which covered eleven sites in three inner urban districts of Oslo, assume ambivalence, as they oscillate between the intimate and the public."

In 2017, during her artist residence in Hongcheon, South Korea, Thyra Schmidt created the art work Two friends leave the room and walk in different directions – the sentence was translated into Korean and was exposed as textile banner at the facade of the Hongcheon Art Museum for the group exhibition Moving Shadow. The artist's “sentence contrasts the commercial messages. For the Korean public it had more a private or a complex philosophical character. […] Others, notably European beholders, saw a more political inspired reference. This might be evident, with regard to the location in South Korea and its historical separation of North Korea.” Thyra Schmidt “does not want to specify any interpretation. In the contrary, she hopes that ʽwhen read, an imaginary picture emerges. In the best case, many changing images. Images that evoke different associations. Images that allow complex interpretations.ʼ(Artist statement)”

== Publications (selection) ==
- 2005 Muse heute, exhibition catalogue, ed. Kunsthalle Bremen
- 2010 Thyra Schmidt, I can’t just be nowhere, texts by Anne Rodler and Thomas W. Rieger, extra Verlag, ISBN 978-3-938370-42-1
- 2012 Fehlstelle, artist book, text by Valeria Liebermann, ed. Städtische Galerie Offenburg, modo Verlag, ISBN 978-3-86833-102-8
- 2019 Über Diebe und die Liebe / On Thieves and Love, artist's book, artist's text, Edition Cantz, ISBN 978-3-947563-67-8
