= Hendrik Krawen =

German artist

- Born: 1963 (age 62–63); Lübeck, Germany
- Education: Kunstakademie Düsseldorf
- Known for: Painting, printmaking, installation art

Hendrik Krawen (born 1963 in Lübeck, Germany) is a German contemporary visual artist working in printmaking, painting, and installation. He is a great-grandson of ornithologist and painter Richard Nagel and the father of theatre artist Luis August Krawen.

== Life and work ==
From 1978 to 1981 Krawen studied painting in the studio of Rainer Erhard Teubert and in 1980 learned architectural illustration from a commercial illustrator in Lübeck. Between 1982 and 1990, with interruptions, he studied at the Kunstakademie Düsseldorf under Alfonso Hüppi. Between 1984 and 1996, the artist James Lee Byars was also an important influence on his work. In 1990 he co-initiated the “EX WM” project and from 1992 to 1994 the WP8 project space in Düsseldorf.

In 1994 Krawen received a grant from the Günther-Peill Foundation and in 1995 one from the Barkenhoff Foundation.

In 2000 he and his family moved to Berlin. His motifs of ruins and industrial buildings originated in Düsseldorf, where the demolition of old factories near his studio on Kölner Straße sparked his interest in themes of loss and disappearance.

Andreas Reihse of the band Kreidler summarizes Krawen’s subject matter as “man-made structures arranged in urban space.” He borrows elements “from printmaking, architecture, and especially typography.” Numerous references to Romantic iconography are notable: Martina Weinhart identifies them in the ruined Thälmann statue in Ernst 2003; Barbara Hess highlights occasional figures seen from behind, and Maren Lübbke notes recurring ship motifs. In interviews he has also cited painters Barnett Newman and Chéri Samba and films such as Menschen am Sonntag, The Red Desert, Alphaville, Blade Runner, and Do the Right Thing as inspirations. Since the 1980s he has aimed for his images to appear neither tied to a specific origin nor to a particular era. A further interest is depicting House-music record covers, whose titles he considers poetically charged.

In 2007–08 Krawen was a visiting professor at the Hochschule für bildende Künste Hamburg.

== Reception ==
Sven Drühl divided Krawen’s work into four categories in Artist Kunstmagazin (2000): expanded landscapes isolating “subjectively preferred motifs” like ruins, interiors, and tankers on monochrome grounds; “discothèque pictures” showing arranged objects such as records and lamps on patterned stripes; text-like frozen letters; and numerous artist collaborations including Una Cosa d’Amour, in which he augmented a photo by Katharina Jacobsen with marker.

Barbara Hess described his architectural depictions in Treffpunkt Berlin (Gallery Bochynek, Düsseldorf) as “unspectacular aesthetics”: muted, linoleum-like surfaces contrast with perspectival elements, evoking de Chirico’s enigmatic spaces.

Maren Lübbke praised his use of emptiness to open up “immeasurable space”, quoting Krawen: “I could paint clouds, but that would fill the image too obviously. I need a motif for this undefined expanse.” His 2004 installation of side-lit spaces at Kunsthalle Düsseldorf echoed this “motivic clearing”. Christiane Meixner wrote in Tagesspiegel: “His motifs merge with monochrome, indeterminate backgrounds. Soon they will vanish, leaving only magical impressions in memory.”

Gudrun Bott, on the 2002 Urbane Sequenzen exhibition, noted that Krawen’s monuments, set on narrow ledges and unanchored in perspective, gain model-like quality, and that muted tones evoke fragile memories without nostalgia.

In SEE History 2003 at Kunsthalle Kiel, Sabine Bartelsheim highlighted his precise motifs against unreal color fields, using realism to underscore the limits of depicted reality.

At Shades of Green (2011, Galleria Lia Rumma), Giorgio Salzano wrote of a “refined suspension in green”, where flattened horizons and the interplay of architecture and solitude warn of environmental change.

== Public collections ==
- Bayerische Staatsgemäldesammlungen, Munich
- Kunsthalle zu Kiel
- Musée d’Art moderne et contemporain de Strasbourg
- Sammlung Falckenberg, Hamburg
- Museum Kunstpalast, Düsseldorf
- Leopold-Hoesch-Museum, Düren
