= Kosuke Tsumura =

Japanese artist (born 1959)

Kosuke Tsumura (born 1959) is a Japanese fashion designer and artist particularly known for his Final Home label.

== Early life ==
Kosuke Tsumura was born in 1959 in Saitama, Japan.

In 1982 he won the Soen Prize, an award made by the leading Japanese fashion magazine Soen since 1956 to new young talent in the field of fashion design. Previous winners had included Kansai Yamamoto and Yohji Yamamoto. Issey Miyake, another former winner of the Soen Award, employed Tsumura the following year.

== Career ==
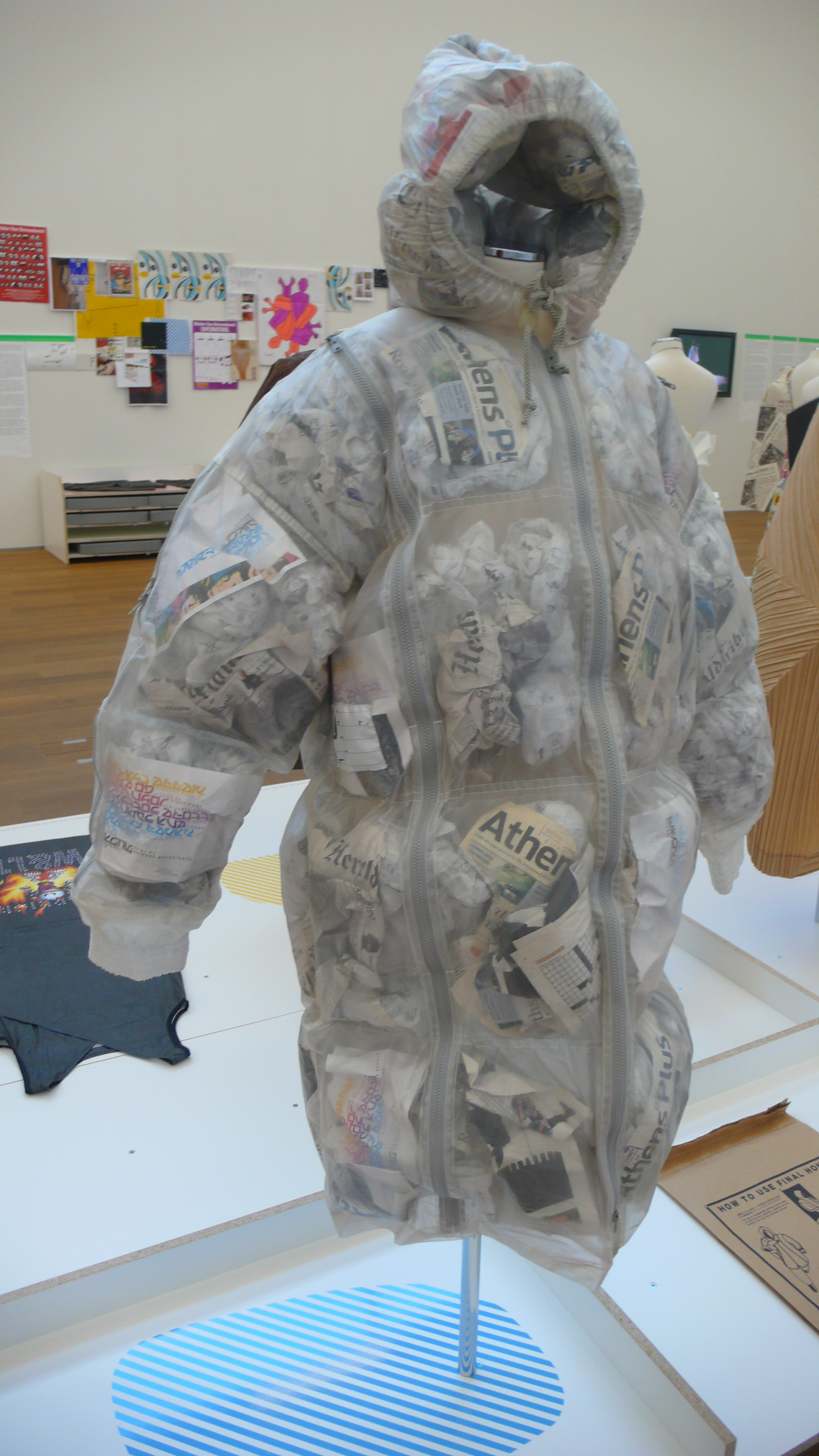
1994 "Final Home" nylon parka, the pockets stuffed with newspaper for insulation

Tsumura joined Miyake's business in 1983, and with the support of the Miyake Design Studio, launched his own-name label in 1994. Final Home became a popular label for young people in Japan, who appreciated its combination of simplicity, humour, and multi-functional design.

His work focuses upon function, protection, recycling, and survival, such as ponchoes that double as bicycle covers. Tsumura's key design is the Final Home coat (also known as Homel or Survival Jacket), conceived as an essential piece should the wearer find themselves made homeless due to war, natural disaster or unemployment. The sheer nylon coat, a staple design for Tsumura since 1994, is made with multiple pockets throughout its construction which are designed to hold survival essentials such as medicine or food rations, or to be stuffed with newspaper for heat insulation, or soft toys to keep children distracted. By adjusting the levels of padding in various pockets, the garment can be made to fit various sizes. To test his concept, Tsumura wore the prototype to sleep rough in Centennial Park, New York for several nights. The Final Home coat has been exhibited in shows around the world, and examples are in museum and art gallery collections including the Museum of Modern Art, New York; Powerhouse Museum, Australia; the Kyoto Costume Institute,; and the ATOPOS collection, Athens.

In 2020, Tsumura said that the Issey Miyake company still held the copyright to Final Home, hence why the brand was no longer in operation.

=== As artist ===
Due to the success of the Final Home label, Tsumura was able to become increasingly experimental as a designer and also pursue artistic endeavours outside the fashion industry.

In 1992 he received second prize in the 21st exhibition of Japanese contemporary art in Tokyo's Museum of Contemporary Art, and exhibited again there in 1999. He contributed to the Venice Biennale of Architecture in 2000 and the Shanghai Biennale in 2002.
