= Arndt & Partner =

Contemporary art gallery in Berlin, Germany

Arndt & Partner was the name of a contemporary art gallery based in Berlin, Germany, founded by Matthias Arndt, that belongs to the city's most important exhibition sites. The gallery represents a programme of international artists including Douglas Kolk, Thomas Hirschhorn, Sophie Calle and Muntean and Rosenblum.

== History ==
Facing the challenge of a continuously redefining art scene, Arndt & Partner emphasised a programme free of trends or (formal) standards from the beginning. Opening a new space in the Hackesche Höfe in Berlin-Mitte in 1994, Arndt and Partner was amongst the first galleries to establish itself in the new centre of Berlin.

The discovery of emerging Berlin artists and the formation of an international programme of artistic positions which had often not yet been exhibited in Berlin nor in Germany beforehand, then became the cornerstones of the gallery profile. In 1997, Arndt & Partner moved to Auguststrasse so as to contribute to the newly emerging gallery centre. There Arndt & Partner developed into an internationally operating art business, with branches in Zurich, New York City and Singapore, participating at the most important international art fairs, such as Art Basel, Art Basel Miami Beach, The Armory Show in New York, ARCO in Madrid, Zona Maco in México City and Frieze Art Fair in London.

In Spring 2010, Matthias Arndt renamed Arndt & Partner into ARNDT and subsequently in 2015 he founded Arndt Art Agency (A3) in Berlin.

== Artists affiliated with the gallery ==
- Adam Adach
- Erik Bulatov
- Sophie Calle
- Joe Coleman
- William Cordova
- Yannick Demmerle
- Mathilde ter Heijne
- Anton Henning
- Thomas Hirschhorn
- Jitish Kallat
- Jon Kessler
- Douglas Kolk
- Karsten Konrad
- Josephine Meckseper
- Vik Muniz
- Muntean and Rosenblum
- Julian Rosefeldt
- Charles Sandison
- Dennis Scholl
- Nedko Solakov
- Hiroshi Sugito
- Ena Swansea
- Susan Turcot
- Keith Tyson
- Shi Xinning

Works by the gallery artists have been shown in many important exhibitions and institutions, such as the Venice Biennale (1993, 1995, 1999, 2007) the Biennale of Sydney (1992) the São Paulo Art Biennial (1996, 1998, 2004, 2006), documenta (1992, 2007), Whitney Biennial (2000, 2004), Berlin Biennale (2001), Moscow Biennale (2007), the Shanghai Biennale (2006), Museum of Modern Art New York (2006), Tate Modern (2003), Tate Britain (2004), Neue Nationalgalerie Berlin (2006) and the Tokyo National Museum of Modern Art (2004/5).

Parallel to the solo presentation of the named gallery artists, thematic group exhibitions and collaborations with established artists such as Emilia and Ilya Kabakov and Gilbert & George also shaped the profile of the gallery. In addition to the website and regular catalogue publications, the gallery published a quarterly magazine from 2007 to 2009 entitled "Checkpoint" edited by Kristin Rieber and Katrin Kramer. Further key staff with formative influence include Eleonora Holthoff, Julie Burchardi, Thorsten Ben Albertz, Anna Duque y Gonzalez, Axel Benz, Natalija Martinovic, René Lahn, Michèle Sandoz and Marianne Karabelnik.

== Literature ==
- »Ten Years. 1994-2004«, with texts by Matthias Arndt and Peter Herbstreuth, Berlin 2004. ISBN 3-00-014199-5.
