= Jacques Lévy =

French geographer and university professor (born 1952)

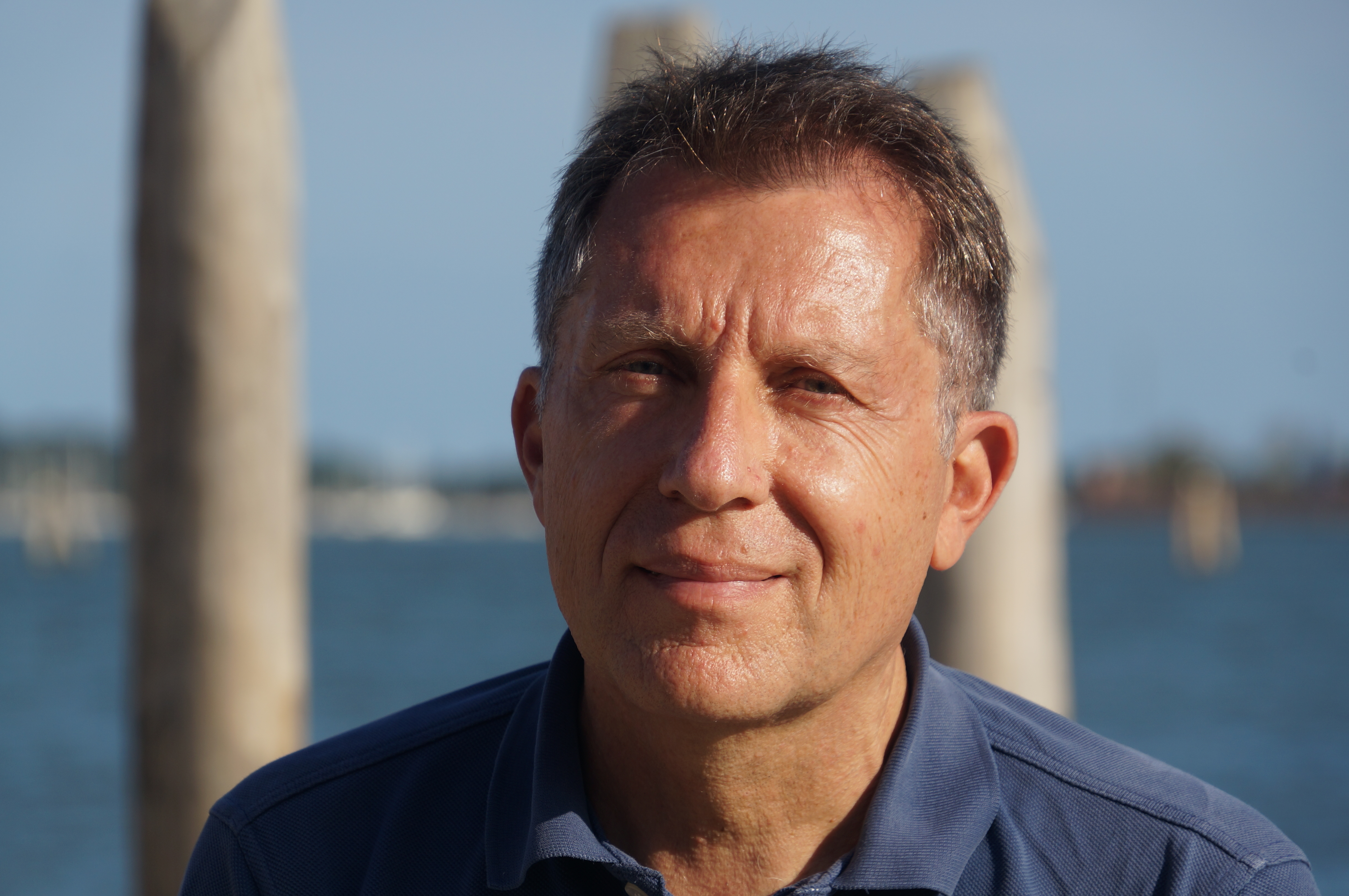
- Born: 14 October 1952 (age 74)
- Known for: Urbanity, World-society, cartographic turn, epistemology of social sciences

Academic background
- Influences: Lefebvre, Elias, Goffman, Jacobs

Academic work
- Discipline: Geography, social theory, political geography, cartography
- Institutions: Swiss Federal Institute of Technology in Lausanne

Jacques Lévy is a professor of geography and urbanism at the School of Architecture, Civil and Environmental Engineering of the École Polytechnique Fédérale de Lausanne (EPFL). He is the director of Chôros Laboratory and of the Doctoral Program in Architecture and Science of the City. He is the cofounder of the scientific journal EspacesTemps.net (ISSN 1777-5477). He published in French, along with Michel Lussault, the dictionary of geography and space of societies, Dictionnaire de la géographie et de l’espace des sociétés.He has contributed to in the epistemological and theoretical reform of geography as a science of the spatial dimension of the social, open to the social sciences and philosophy. Starting from political geography, he has most notably explored the city, urbanity, Europe and globalization. He works also for the introduction of non-verbal languages, especially audio-visual languages, at all levels of research. In 2013 he made a feature film, Urbanity/ies, which is intended as a manifesto for scientific film.

== Biography ==
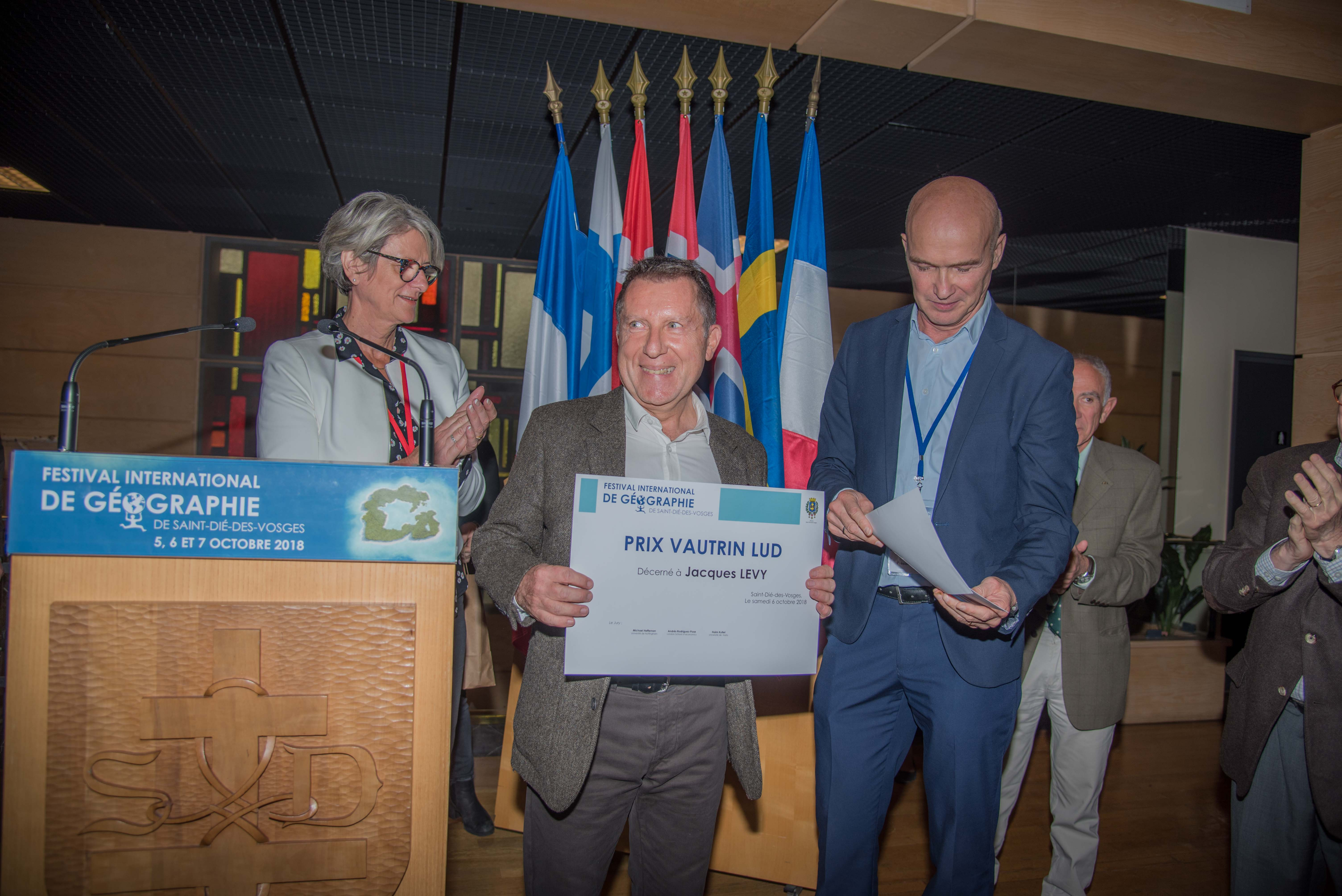
Jacques Lévy being awarded the 2018 Vautrin Lud Prize.

Born in Paris in 1952, Jacques Lévy got his geography Agrégation [national competitive examination] at the University of Paris VII in 1974. In 1975, he became co-founder and coordinator of the editorial board of the magazine EspacesTemps. In 1984, he was hired by the CNRS as a researcher and obtained his PhD in 1993 with a thesis in political geography on legitimate space. In 1993, he was named university professor at Reims. He was a senior lecturer and then professor at l'Institut d 'études politiques de Paris (Sciences Po) from 1999 to 2007 and has been a visiting professor at the University of New York, Los Angeles (UCLA), Naples (IUO), São Paulo (USP), Mexico (Cátedra Reclus), Sydney (Macquarie University), Bergamo (Università degli Studi di Bergamo), Liège (ULiège) and a fellow at the Wissenschaftskolleg zu Berlin (2003–2004). Since 2001, he has served as an advisor to the French Ministry of research. He is co-director of the free social science journal EspacesTemps.net and of the L’espace en société collection at the Presses polytechniques et universitaires romandes. He has been nominated for the Grand Prix International de l’Urbanisme (2017).

A political geography specialist, he has conducted numerous research missions on urbanity in cities in North and South countries, and is an active participant in the debate on cities, regional development and the relationship between space and politics, Europe and globalization.

== Major theoretical contributions ==
Jacques Lévy's work concerns the spatial dimension of societies, with a focus on political spaces. He developed a new approach on geography in his most comprehensive book L’espace légitime in which he analyzes the geographic dimension of the political function. His researches on the legitimate scale of politics include works on the city, France, Europe and the World. The notion of urbanity is also central in his work. He also supports the relevance of using non verbal languages as scientific means for researchers, especially cartography and cinema. He is the director of a scientific film named Urbanity/ies. Conducted in interdisciplinary groups, his research focuses on such topics as urban models, mobility, the micro-geography of public spaces and the extent of globalization in metropolitan areas. His work also embraces sociology, anthropology, architecture and human geography, skillfully combining both theory and the realization of concrete projects. Within the Direction à l'aménagement du territoire et à l'action régionale (DATAR) in Paris, he has notably developed practices of participatory mapping that seek to fully involving the populations concerned.

=== Epistemology of geography and the theory of the social ===
He has actively been involved in the epistemological and theoretical reform of geography since as 1975, arguing that the latter is defined as the study of the spatial dimension of the social. The inclusion of geography in the “common trunk of social sciences” led him to develop “realistic constructivism,” a general epistemology, starting in 1994 and then in 1999. The latter seeks to make the best use of the constructivist approach (knowledge is invention) while asserting the specificity of the regime of truth of the scientific project as the cognitive goal. He likewise built a social theory based on “dialogic systemism,” i.e. a vision of society as a whole that is sensitive to the action of the actors within it and which diverges from both structuralism and methodological individualism. In the 2000s and 2010s he continued in the same vein, introducing an actor/object/environment triptych that made it possible to take into account the contributions of an “actor turn” in thinking on non-human agents, and generalize the concept of environment by refusing to limit social aggregates to "assemblages." He is part of an informal network that includes several French-speaking geographers, including Christian Grataloup, Denis Retaillé, Michel Lussault, Mathis Stock, Olivier Lazzarotti, Anne Volvey, Boris Beaude and Marc Dumont, as well as English, Italian, German and Portuguese geographers and non-geographers, including sociologists, political scientists, historians, cartographers, planners and developers.

=== Theory of space ===
Since 1994, one of Jacques Lévy's main contributions is the formalization of a theory of social space, most notably through the building of a vocabulary that reworks basic concepts while making them coherent. The definition of space as a set of relationships of distance, in a Leibnizian perspective, helps in escaping Newtonian and Cartesian absolutism and identifying the two major attributes of space (metrics and scale) in close connection with that which, in social reality, is not spatial (substance). The territory/network, topography/topology and place/area duos, as well as his work on “interspatialities” (interaction, co-presence, nesting and "synchronization") complete the basic glossary that the Dictionary of geography and space of the societies developed with the contributions of more than one hundred authors representative of contemporary social sciences of space. Space as an environment and spatiality as an action thus appear to be the basis of "geographicity" thus redefined. Since 2001, Lévy has revisited the concept of dwelling based on a re- historicized integration of the contributions of Martin Heidegger, in which there is tension between space and spatiality, that is, between enclosing but fragile environments and enclosed but strategic actors.

=== Political geography ===
As early as 1984, in analyzing the municipal elections in Paris, he showed the existence of a political space that was not reducible to the distribution of social groups defined on the basis of socio-economic criteria. His doctoral thesis focused on the intersection of the two dimensions of the social: the political and the spatial. The resulting book, L’Espace Légitime, is an exploration of the junction of these dimensions. First, it clarifies the concepts of politics regulated within a society by legitimacy versus geopolitics regulated between societies through violence. Moreover, the empirical corpus largely consists of French election results since World War II. Since 1997, this analytical work has been supplemented by numerous electoral studies on the France, Switzerland, the European Union and the United States, often published in newspapers and scientific journals. It appears that, when questions of openness (to Europe, migrants, religions or minority sexual orientations) arise, the electoral space is highly sensitive to gradients of urbanity. Central areas of large cities are often favorable to such otherness while those in peri-urban areas and smaller towns are more reticent or even hostile.

=== The city and urbanity ===
Starting 1983, he began work on the city which would gradually become a general theory of urbanity. The concept of urbanity, based on the multidimensional combination of density and diversity, allows for a convergence of all the work of the social sciences on the city. This makes it possible to overcome morphological tropisms and break from the historical European matrix to study the urbanization process and the dynamics of urban societies without bias. He shows that, in developed countries and soon throughout the world, urbanization is ending. Distinctions between rural and urban are giving way to internal differences of the urban world, which he calls gradients of urbanity. In the tradition of Henri Lefebvre and Jane Jacobs, he stresses the fact that urbanity is a social reality, a developmental horizon and a political issue as such, challenging economistic and communitarian approaches like those of the North American Marxists, and instead claiming the relevance of space as an interpretive lens of urbanity.

This led him to criticize the use of the concept – in itself questionable – of "gentrification" to describe processes that increase social diversity in a neighborhood. Regarding urban planning practices, he is developing a theory of public space as a multi-scale concentrate of urbanity, where intimacy unfolds not less than in the private sphere, and wherein a way of doing politics based essentially on interaction and civility functions. The concept of public space (öffentlicher Raum), though separated from the more general one of public sphere (Kant and Habermas's Öffentlichkeit) convergence with works hitherto little connected: those of Norbert Elias on the society of individuals, those of Erving Goffman on interactions in public and those of Lyn Lofland on the “public realm.” He highlighted the role of serendipity as a particularly effective creative force in the public space.

He has also incorporated mobility into his thinking by linking transport with the issue of public space and encouraging researchers to give greater consideration to walking. With François Ascher and Sylvain Allemand he organized a conference at Cerisy in 2003 and edited Les sens du mouvement, Belin, 2004. At the EPFL, he works in collaboration with sociologist Vincent Kaufmann on mobility issues. He currently heads the PostCarWorld network research program (2014–2016), which brings together a multidisciplinary group of Swiss researchers to propose sociological, geographical, architectural and technical simulations of a world without cars.

This conceptual work is fueled by numerous field studies, particularly in the world's largest cities. He has developed a method based on free exploration of urban environments, mostly on foot, to facilitate comparisons by the body, and the scales and metrics of different cities. It is in this regard that his work is in the tradition of those of Georg Simmel, Walter Benjamin, Guy Debord and Michel de Certeau. A feature film, Urbanité/s, produced by the Chôros laboratory in 2013, sums up in images the entire approach, while at the same time being intended as a manifesto of scientific cinema.

He has criticized certain schools of thought in North American geography and sociology, led most notably by David Harvey and Neil Smith, for their inability to take into account the profound nature of urbanity by reducing it to a clash between communities or economic or political domination. He has characterized this movement, with its strong activist focus combining Marxism and culturalism and promoting the defense of the homogeneity of the slums, as "neo-structuralist," whereas for Jacques Lévy, urban development should aim for sociological and functional diversity.

From these theoretical and empirical explorations he concludes that the debate on desirable urbanity has becomes polarized around two models of urbanity: one is the “Amsterdam model,” which accepts urbanity and the exposure to otherness this implies, while the other – the “Johannesburg model” – rejects it, accepting urbanity only reluctantly by seeking to privatize everything that can be privatized. According to him, the first model, if adopted by inhabitants, tends to produce a “collected city” one finds mainly in large city centers in Europe and Asia. The second model, on the other hand, produces the "scattered and fragmented urbanity" often found in small towns and city outskirts in North America and Africa.

=== Globalization and World-society ===
Since 1991 and his work – first didactic, then theoretical – with Marie-Françoise Durand and Denis Retaillé, he has developed a theory of globalization using four "explanatory models" (the world as a collection of worlds, the world as a force field, the world as a hierarchical network and the world as a society), each of which considers a dimension of today's world but not all of its reality. This means that, since 1996, he has insisted that the challenge of the contemporary phase is the construction of a World-society. In the collective work L’invention du Monde, which he edited in 2008, he linked various components of today's world (including the Earth as one of the "natures of humanity") and suggested a periodization of globalization in seven phases, the first being the spread of Homo sapiens across the planet. By analyzing recent events, he confirmed the impossibility of explaining the current dynamics using only geopolitical or economic logics, as well as the need to observe the emergence of a society of individuals at the global scale through the appropriate "lenses." In Europe: A geography he laid out the main concepts of geography, including those he tested at the global scale, to approach the highly complex space that is Europe through its history and geography.

=== Cartography ===
Since 2002 and in a more systematic way in 2004, he identified a gap between what he calls a “geographical turn” and the state of mapping. Since 1994 he has sought to use innovative mapping languages but came to the conclusion that only a “geographical turn” could connect the spatial language of maps with the theoretical demands of geography and the evolution of the world, most notably characterized by mobility, the emergence of individual spatial actors and globalization—some of the many challenges of traditional mapping. One of the evolutionary paths he explores is the broadening of the range of cartographic techniques and semiotics to escape from a "Euclidean prison," which cannot correctly process both cities and the global scale. More specifically, he developed the use of cartograms by developing the software ScapeToad, an auto-extensive (i.e. without background) and animation map, with his team. In the Chôros laboratory, he regularly produces both maps and theoretical reflection on mapping, drawing on history as well as other mapping techniques (e.g. non-Western schools, maps from stateless societies and from contemporary art). In 2016, he edited a comprehensive synthesis about the different aspects of this “cartographic turn”.

=== Spatial justice and France ===
His interest in France as a unique space has always been obvious in his work through urban issues. He then connected the latter with his analyses of political space. Since 1996 he has been the scientific advisor for the journal Pouvoirs locaux, and contributes to French society's debate on the organization and governance of its territories. Similarly, he has participated, as a researcher, in many of the projects and studies led by the French institution DATAR – which became CGET (Commissariat général à l'Égalité des territoires – general Commission for equality of the Territories) in 2014. More recently, he has been reworking a problem originally launched in 19941 – that of spatial justice, dealing with the concept in general and applying it to France specifically. On this point his approach differs from Ed Soja's neo-structuralist one by proposing a view of spatial justice based on urbanity, inhabiting and the co-production of public goods. In 2013 he published Réinventer la France, which takes stock of the end of urbanization and stipulates the idea – already put forth by Pierre Veltz and Jean Viard – of an archipelago society, to be understood here as a series of urban areas that resemble one another more so than their hinterlands, and whose differences are internal to them, by gradients of urbanity. In this book, he shows that the gap between the reality of the French space and the map of political territories is not only archaic but also unjust. Hence, his reflection is on spatial justice that addresses territorial divisions, taxation, urban planning, and public health and education policies. He concludes that space and the issues surrounding it (urbanity, mobility, dwelling, etc.) should be addressed with a view to co-producing public goods with inhabitants. In the same spirit, he has participated in the debate on "territorial reform" initiated by the Government in 2014.

== Bibliography ==
=== Books ===
- 1992 : Le Monde : espaces et systèmes, Marie-Françoise Durand, Jacques Lévy and Denis Retaillé, Dalloz, ISBN 978-2-7246-0633-1.
- 1994 : L'Espace légitime, Jacques Lévy, Presses de Sciences Po, ISBN 978-2-7246-0644-7.
- 1997 : Europe, une géographie : la fabrique d'un continent, Jacques Lévy, Hachette Supérieur (2nd edition, 2011), ISBN 978-2-01-146146-9.
- 1999 : Le Tournant géographique, Jacques Lévy, Belin, ISBN 978-2-7011-2467-4.
- 2007 : Milton Santos, philosophe du mondial, citoyen du local, Jacques Lévy, Presses polytechniques et universitaires romandes, ISBN 978-2-88074-709-1.
- 2013 : Réinventer la France : Trente cartes pour une nouvelle géographie, Jacques Lévy, fayard, ISBN 978-2-213-67197-0.
- 2017 : Atlas politique de la France, Autrement, with Ana Póvoas, Ogier Maitre, and Jean-Nicholas Fauchille, ISBN 978-2-7467-4541-4

=== Edited books ===
- 1991 : Géographies du politique, Jacques Lévy (Editor), Presses de Sciences Po, ISBN 978-2-7246-0595-2.
- 2000 : Logiques de l'espace, esprit des lieux, Jacques Lévy and Michel Lussault (Editors), Belin, ISBN 978-2-7011-2840-5.
- 2001 : From Geopolitics to Global Politics, Jacques Lévy (Editor), Routledge Studies in Geopolitics, ISBN 978-0-7146-5107-1.
- 2003 : Dictionnaire de la géographie et de l'espace des sociétés, Jacques Lévy and Michel Lussault (Editors), Belin (2nd edition, 2013), ISBN 978-2-7011-6395-6.
- 2004 : Les Sens du mouvement, Jacques Lévy, Sylvain Allemand and François Ascher (Editors), Belin, ISBN 2-7011-4066-8.
- 2008 : L'invention du monde. Une géographie de la mondialisation, Jacques Lévy (Editor), Presses de Sciences Po, ISBN 978-2-7246-1041-3.
- 2008 : The City, Ashgate, ISBN 978-0-7546-2814-9
- 2015 : A Cartographic Turn: Mapping and the Spatial Challenge in Social Sciences, PPUR/Routledge, ISBN 978-2-940222-70-4

=== Movies ===
- 2013 : Urbanity/ies, Jacques Lévy (Director), Chôros (Production), Thomas Bataille and Jacques Lévy (Images), Olivier Zuchuat (Montage).
- 2015 : Thinking Places, a nine-film series
- 2015 : Exploring Humans’ Spaces, MOOC (Chôros/edX)
