= Naomi Devil =

Hungarian painter, graphic designer (born 1987)

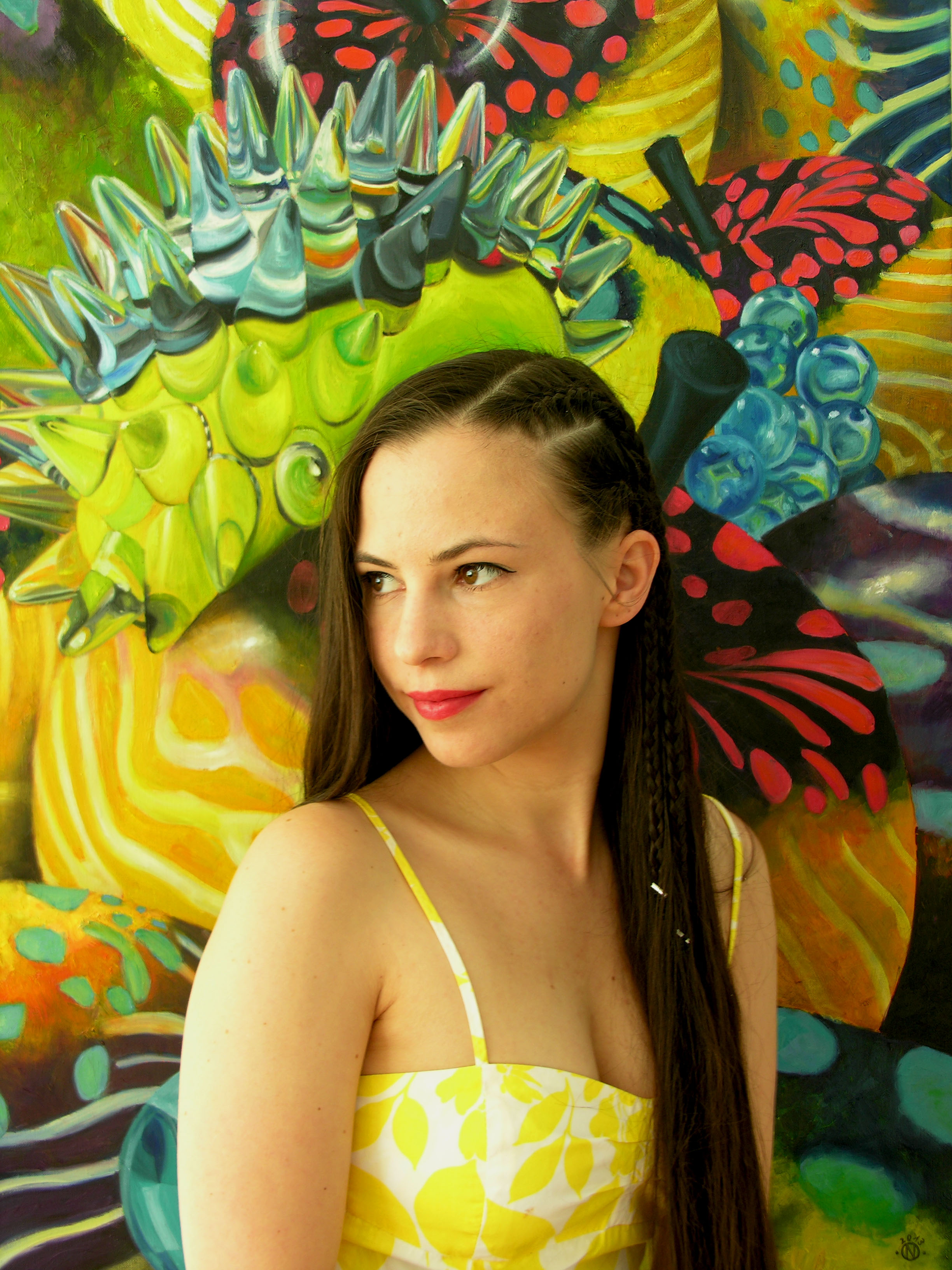
Naomi Devil with her painting Temptation in the background (2013)

Naomi Devil, originally Noémi Anna Ördög (born 10 March 1987), is a Hungarian painter and graphic designer.

== Education ==
Naomi Devil was born in Budapest in 1987 as the second child of her parents. She came into contact with art early in her childhood since her grandfather László Ördögh Senior was a painter and her father studied applied arts and became an industrial designer. Devil attended elementary school in Budapest and from the second semester of the tenth grade became a private student in the secondary school. She spent the summer in Salzburg where she attended a five-week course led by professor Caroline Broadhead at the International Summer Academy for Fine Arts. There she decided to become an artist and therefore she completed the last two classes of high school in one year as a private student. She graduated from secondary school at the age of 17 and entered the Academy of Fine Arts Vienna that same year.

She was admitted to the contextual painting class. She began her studies in 2004 in the class of the professors Markus Muntean and Adi Rosenblum. From the second year her professor was Elke Krystufek and from the third year onwards Ashley Hans Scheirl. She graduated in 2008 and got the title magister of art. In the meantime the artist spent two more summers in Salzburg and attended the courses of Rivka Rinn and Andrea Fogli at the International Summer Academy for Fine Arts.

While studying painting at the Academy of Fine Arts Vienna, Naomi Devil studied from 2006 to 2010 architecture as well at the Technical University of Vienna. From 2011 she studied graphic design in professor Oliver Kartak's class at the University of Applied Arts Vienna. She graduated in 2015 and got her second academic title.

== Artistic activity ==
Devil works mainly as a painter. She paints with oils on canvas. She allows her skills and experience from the fields of design, architecture and visual arts to flow into her painting methods. She deals with the dialogue between different artistic and historical epochs. She places figures from historical paintings in a contemporary context to call the attention to changes in lifestyle and habits. She selects these situations in such a way that she also reacts to current events.

She has worked on several film productions with digital 3D animations. She made the digital reconstructions of Nicolas Schöffer's lost or never realized works for the film The wonderful world of Nicolas Schöffer. The director of the film was Sándor Gerebics. The film was shown on the occasion of the Expo 2015 in Milan.

Devil also works as a curator. She organized artist exchange exhibitions between Hungary and Austria.

Her work has been exhibited in more than a dozen countries since 2004. In February 2019 the Exhibition Hall Műcsarnok in Budapest presented a retrospective exhibition of her works. The curator of the exhibition was Zoltán Rockenbauer.

== Awards ==
- 2021: MAOE (National Association of Hungarian Artists) professional distinction on the occasion of the travelling exhibition The Universe of Dante
- 2020: Artfacts Performance Award, Berlin
- 2020: Red Carpet Art Award, Special Distinction
- 2018: EGA Women's Art Award
- 2017: Art Award of the Schönbrunn Professional Association of Austrian Artists, Vienna
- 2017: VI. Water and Life International Biennial of Fine Arts, Caffart Award
- 2017: La Femme 50 Talented Young Hungarians
- 2014: Red Carpet Art Award, Special Distinction
- 2006: Salzburg International Summer Academy of Fine Arts scholarship

== Selection of solo exhibitions ==
- 2023 Obsession, NACO (Nagyházi Contemporary) Gallery, Budapest
- 2022 Kohle auf Leinwand, GPL Contemporary, Vienna (parallel with: Mich zwickt's immer so im Wad'l, Leo Mayr sculptor)
- 2021-2022 Naomi Devil Retrospective, Irányi Palace, Budapest
- 2021 Naomi Devil Retrospective, Csabagyöngye Cultural Center, Békéscsaba, Hungary
- 2020 Return to Natur, Ady25 Gallery, Budapest
- 2019 Spaces (Ap)art, Exhibition Hall Műcsarnok, Budapest
- 2019 Naomi Devil, Large Work Show, EGA Women's Center, Vienna
- 2019 Naomi Devil Solo Exhibition, Kolja Kramer Fine Arts, Art Hub Brotfabrik, Vienna
- 2018 Summer in the city, Ar2day Gallery, Budapest
- 2017 O tempora o mores, Austria Auction Company, Vienna
- 2016 Hedonati, EGA Women's Center, Vienna
- 2016 Hedonati, Naomi Devil, Városi Galéria Kalocsa, Hungary
- 2014 Virtaura, Próféta Gallery, Budapest
- 2013 Looking back to the future, MOYA (Museum of Young Art Vienna)
- 2012 Globális Útvesztőkön, Városi Galéria, Kalocsa
- 2007 SPACE WARP, Hungarian Cultural Center, Prague
