= Fogli =

Fogli is an Italian surname. Notable people with the surname include:

- Andrea Fogli, Italian interior designer
- Laura Fogli (born 1959), Italian long-distance runner
- Riccardo Fogli (born 1947), Italian singer
- Romano Fogli (1938–2021), Italian footballer and manager
