= Karsten Konrad =

German sculptor (born 1962)

- Born: 1962 (age 63–64); Würzburg, Germany
- Citizenship: Germany
- Occupation: Sculptor

Karsten Konrad (born 1962) is a German sculptor whose abstract works address themes of identity, memory, materiality, structuralism, linguistics, as well as concepts from urbanity and urbanism.

== Biography ==
Karsten Konrad studied art at Johannes Gutenberg University in Mainz and sculpture at both Hochschule der Künste in Berlin and the Royal College of Art in London. During the late 1980s, he studied under English sculptor David Evison and Serbian performance artist Marina Abramović.

Konrad's sculptures use everyday materials such as discarded furniture, mechanical objects and architectural elements. He repurposes common items into installations, reliefs and collages.

His work has been exhibited in museums and institutions in Europe, North America and Asia, such as the Esbjerg Art Museum, the Berlin Academy of the Arts, the Hong Kong Arts Centre, the Helsinki Art Museum and the Berlinische Galerie. In 2012, Konrad received the Great Prize of the 53rd Belgrade October Salon for a site-specific art intervention at the Geozavod (Belgrade Cooperative Building, 1907).

From 2010 to 2013, Konrad held academic positions at the Berlin University of the Arts and the China Academy of Art in Hangzhou. Since 2016, he has been a professor in the Sculpture Department of the University of the Arts in Berlin.

He has lived and worked in Berlin since 1993.

== Private and public collections ==
- Bundeskunstsammlung
- Museum Ritter, Waldenbuch
- MoCA Belgrade
- IfA Stuttgart / Berlin
