= Nicolas Schöffer =

French sculptor and plastician (1912–1992)

- Schöffer Miklós
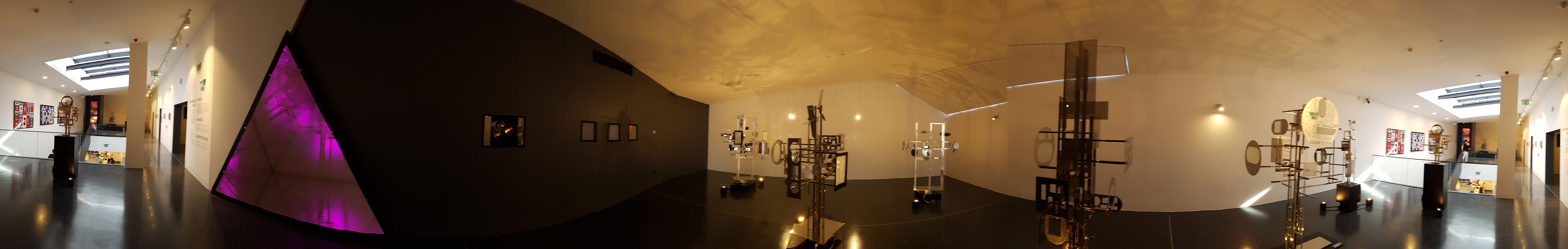
- Nicolas Schöffer Collection Kalocsa
- Born: 6 September 1912; Kalocsa, Hungary
- Died: 8t January 1992; Montmartre, Paris
- Education: Royal Hungarian Pázmány Péter University (Budapest), Faculty of Law Academy of Fine Arts (Budapest) École Nationale Supérieure des Beaux-Arts (Paris)
- Known for: first cybernetic artwork, painting, graphic, sculpture, architecture, urbanism, video, theatre experiment
- Notable work: CYS1 cybernetic sculpture SCAM1 automobile sculpture Plan of a Cybernetic Light Tower for Paris Plan of a cybernetic city KYLDEX1 cybernetic theatre experiment
- Style: 1. Period: surrealism, impressionism, expressionism; 2. Period: kinetic art, cybernetic art, neoplasticism; 3. Period: computer graphics
- Spouse: Marie Rose Marguerite Orlhac Eléonore de Lavandeyra Schöffer
- Awards: Grand prize for sculpture of the Venice Biennale (1968) Officer in the Légion d'Honneur (1983) Frank J. Malina Leonardo Award for lifetime achievement (1986) Officer in the Ordre des Arts et Lettres (1985) Commander in the Ordre National du Mérite (1990) Order of the Flag of the Republic of Hungary (1990)
- Elected: member of the French Academy of Fine Arts

Nicolas Schöffer (Hungarian: Schöffer Miklós; 6 September 1912 – 8 January 1992) was a Hungarian-born French cybernetic artist. Schöffer was born in Kalocsa, Hungary and lived in France from 1936 until his death in Montmartre, Paris in 1992.

He built his artworks on cybernetic theories of control and feedback primarily based on the ideas of Norbert Wiener. Wiener's work suggested to Schöffer an artistic process in terms of the circular causality of feedback loops that he used in a wide range of art genres. His career spanned painting, sculpture, architecture, urbanism, film, theatre, television and music. The quest for dematerialisation of the artwork and the pursuit of movement and dynamics became central themes of his work. He worked with the immaterial media space, time, light, sound and climate that he called the five topologies.

He liberated art genres from their spatial and temporal constraints by creating never-ending sound structures that can be heard all over the cybernetic city of the future, and by designing SCAM1, an automobile sculpture.

Schöffer declared the socialization of art as an important goal. According to his ideas, art should be available as a cultural asset equally to everyone without limitations. The playful and spectacular aspects of his works served the goal of gaining the attention of the audience and involving the viewer through participation in the creative processes. To make art universally available, he explored the possibilities of serial production.

== Life and career ==
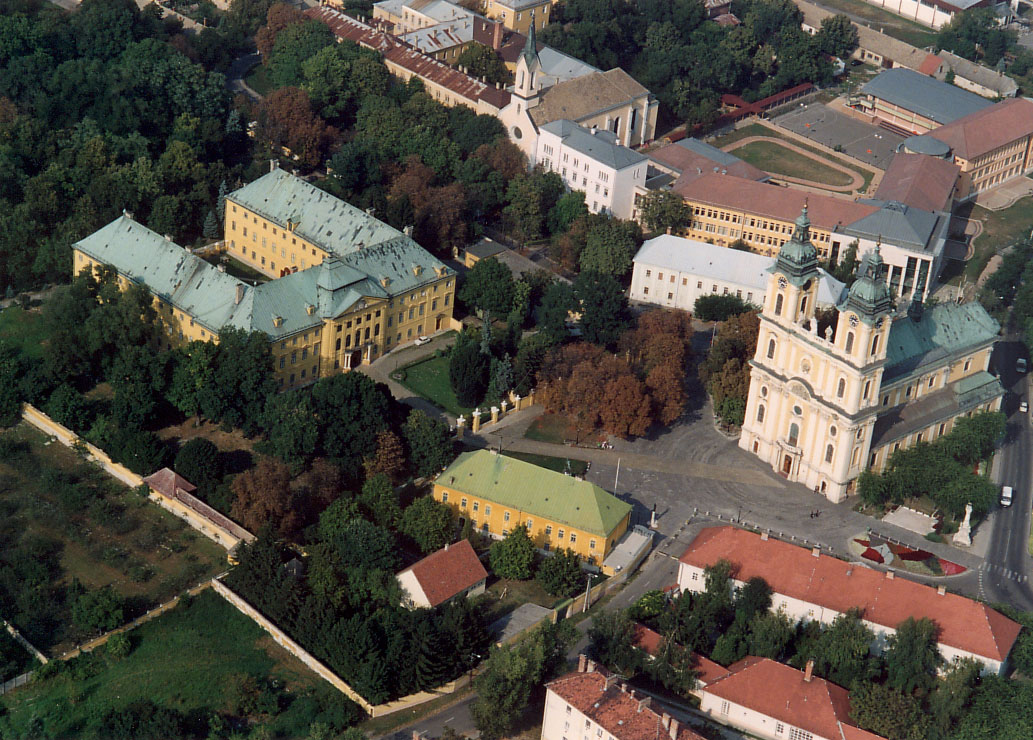
Archiepiscopal palace in Kalocsa, Hungary

Schöffer was born in Kalocsa in the south of Hungary. His mother was a violinist and took care of his musical education, and encouraged him to draw. He took piano lessons from the age of seven. The father was a lawyer.

After elementary school, Schöffer continued to study with the Jesuits, despite his Jewish descent. This duality of religious education led to an openness towards other religious attitudes that is expressed by his idea of a universal religion in the cybernetic city of the future.

Thanks to the influence of his father, Schöffer left home to study law at the Royal Hungarian Pázmány Péter University in Budapest. After graduating as a doctor in law, he studied at the Academy of Fine Arts. In 1932 he took part in the winter exhibition of the national salon in Budapest. It was his only public appearance before the war in Hungary.

In 1936 he left Hungary and settled in Paris. Here, Schöffer continued his studies in the atelier Fernand Sabatté at the École Nationale Supérieure des Beaux-Arts. In 1937 he participated in the Salon d'Automne and in 1938 in the Salon des Indépendants.

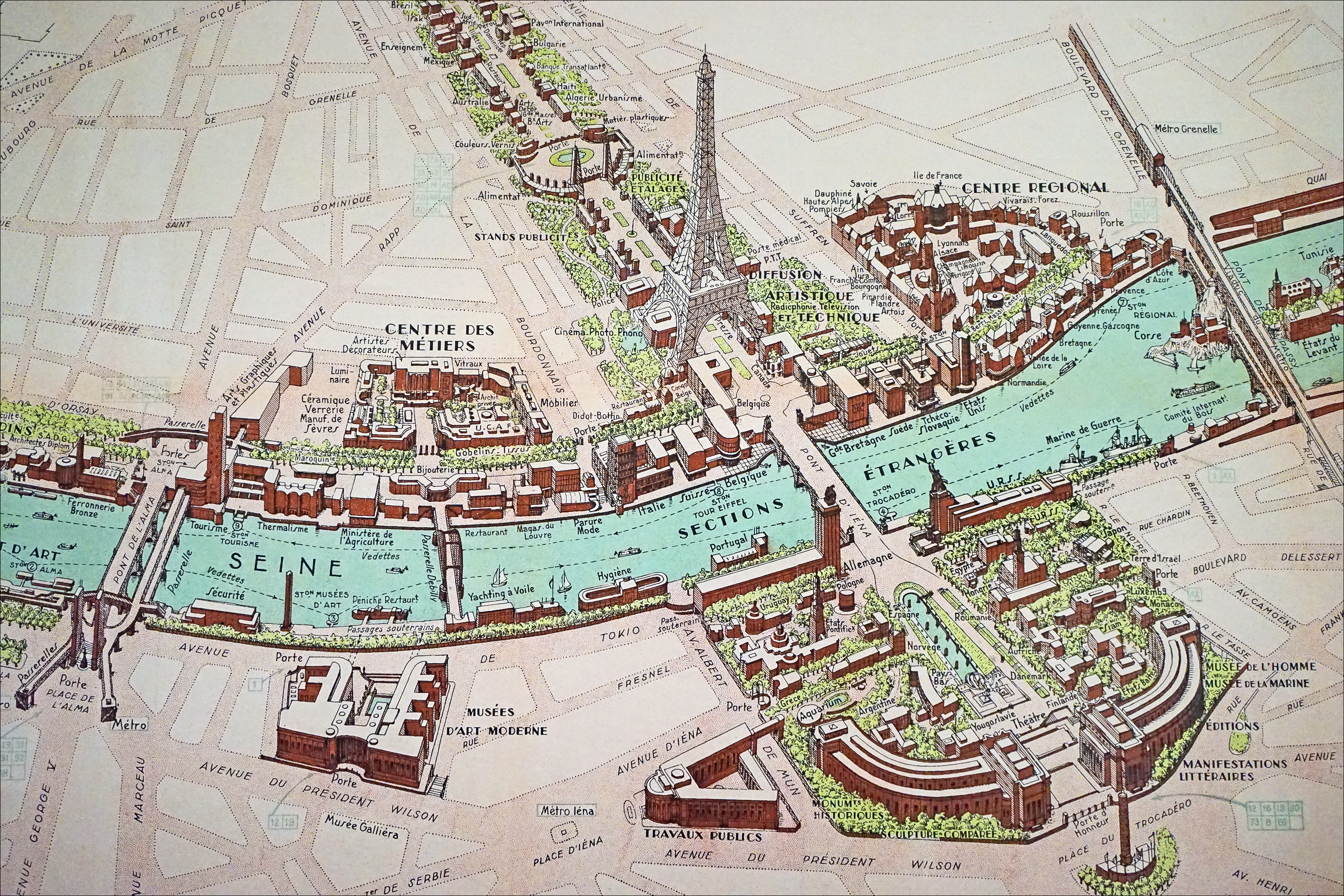
Map of the International Exhibition of Arts and Techniques in Modern Life 1937

The Exposition Internationale des Arts et Techniques dans la Vie Moderne (international exposition of art and technology in modern life) in 1937 had a decisive influence on Schöffer's career. The main attraction of the international exhibition, the palace of discoveries in the west wing of the Grand Palais aroused Schöffer's interest in scientific research and technical innovations. It was thanks to this interest that, just over a decade later, he came across Norbert Wiener's book about cybernetic principles that would radically change his views on art and induce an abrupt change in his artistic practice.

On 14 June 1940, Wehrmacht units marched into Paris. Schöffer fled to southern France and lived in the Aveyron area until his return after the liberation of Paris. During this period he met his first wife, Marie Rose Marguerite Orlhac. They married on February 22, 1945 in Capdenac.

After the war Schöffer and his wife returned to Paris. They lived at 12 rue de Paris in Clichy, and his wife ran an antique shop. Between 1945 and 1949 Schöffer experimented with painting and graphics until he came across Norbert Wiener's book.

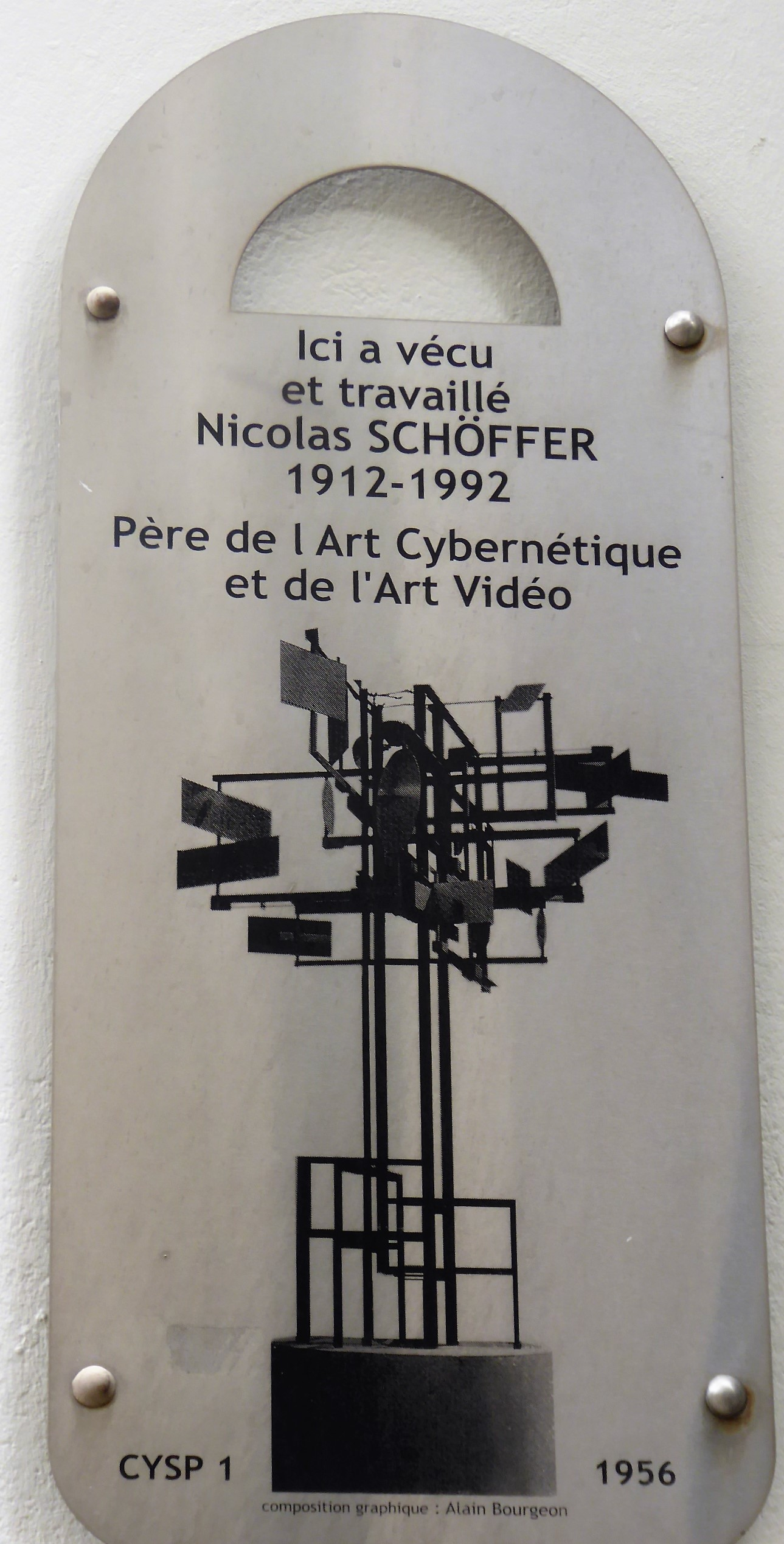
Nicolas Schöffer memorial plaque at the gate of the Villa des Arts, Montmartre

Schöffer lived in the Villa des Arts from 1954, first on the fourth floor and later on the ground floor. La Villa des Arts was built on a site separated from the Montmartre Cemetery. In 1890, King Louis XV had a series of 67 studios built here for artists using materials dismantled from the Universal Exhibition. The stairs of the old Gare Saint Lazare were reused here.

Numerous artists lived and worked in the ateliers, among them Cézanne, Sisley, Marcoussis and Renoir. In his most active years Schöffer had two studios here, one of which previously belonged to Cézanne. Atelier No. 5, the former studio of an equestrian statue sculptor was renovated in 1964. It is the most spectacular atelier of the Villa des Arts. From 1964 Schöffer worked in studio no. 5 and also used studio no. 2.

His artistic breakthrough came in the 1950s. He took part in Documenta II (1959) and Documenta III (1964) in Kassel. In 1968 he took part in the Venice Biennale and was awarded the Grand Prize. He has achieved both international media exposure and institutional recognition.

In 1982, in recognition of his rich body of work, he was elected a member of the French Academy of fine arts. He was promoted to the rank of officer in the Légion d'Honneur in 1983. He was promoted to the rank of officer in the Ordre des Arts et Lettres in 1985. The award of the rank of commander in the Ordre National du Mérite followed in 1990.

In 1986, the artist suffered a brain haemorrhage and never recovered. During the last seven years of his life he used a wheelchair. He was cared for by his second wife, Eléonore de Lavandeyra, whom he married after Orlhac's death. Schöffer died in 1992, but his artworks were kept for decades in his original studio and Schöffer's intellectual legacy maintained. Eléonore de Lavandeyra Schöffer died on 15 January 2020.

== Creative periods ==
Schöffer's artistic career can be divided into three major periods by two clear turning points. He experimented and systematically sought his own artistic position during the early part of his career. The main body of his work belongs to the second period. Art historians distinguish three stages of the second creative period that are related to the theories Schöffer elaborated during these time spans. The third main creative period is marked by his return to two-dimensional works due to his incurable illness which impeded his free movement.

=== First creative period (1931-1950) ===
The stylistic diversity of his first creative period is striking. This comes from a desire to try different techniques and subjects. Cathedrals, depictions of Jesus, nude scenes with Turkish figures, portraits of men, surrealistic creatures with double faces, animals that are only depicted with their characteristic features, various still lifes and rare humorous drawings can be found in the repertoire. He did not make exact copies but he imitated masters of art history to understand their creative methods. Since works of this period were rarely dated it is difficult to establish a chronology, but a development from figurative to abstract works and an approach from the surface into space can be discovered. The transition went from figurative works through a phase of lyric abstraction to geometric abstraction. About the end of this phase Schöffer experimented with a painting pendulum and with a paint gun.

On his way from the surface of a canvas into space the first step was thinking in three dimensions. He imagined an abstract three-dimensional construction and drew its projection onto the surface of the two-dimensional support material. The background was no longer to be viewed as such, but as the space in which the objects depicted exist in three dimensions. The image was only its projection onto a screen.

The second step was to execute the constructions imagined in three dimensions as relief images. The reliefs have a main view and the parts stand out only moderately. A back surface supports the relief. The influence of Mondrian's Neoplasticism can already be felt in these relief images. The elements of this artistic language were the pairs of opposites horizontal/vertical, large/small, light/dark and the reduction of colours to the three primary colours: red, yellow and blue as well as the non-colours: black, gray and white. Later the rear support disappears and the reliefs leave the wall to enter space as sculptural works but still with a single main view. They mark the transition to the second artistic period.

=== Second creative period (1950-1986) ===
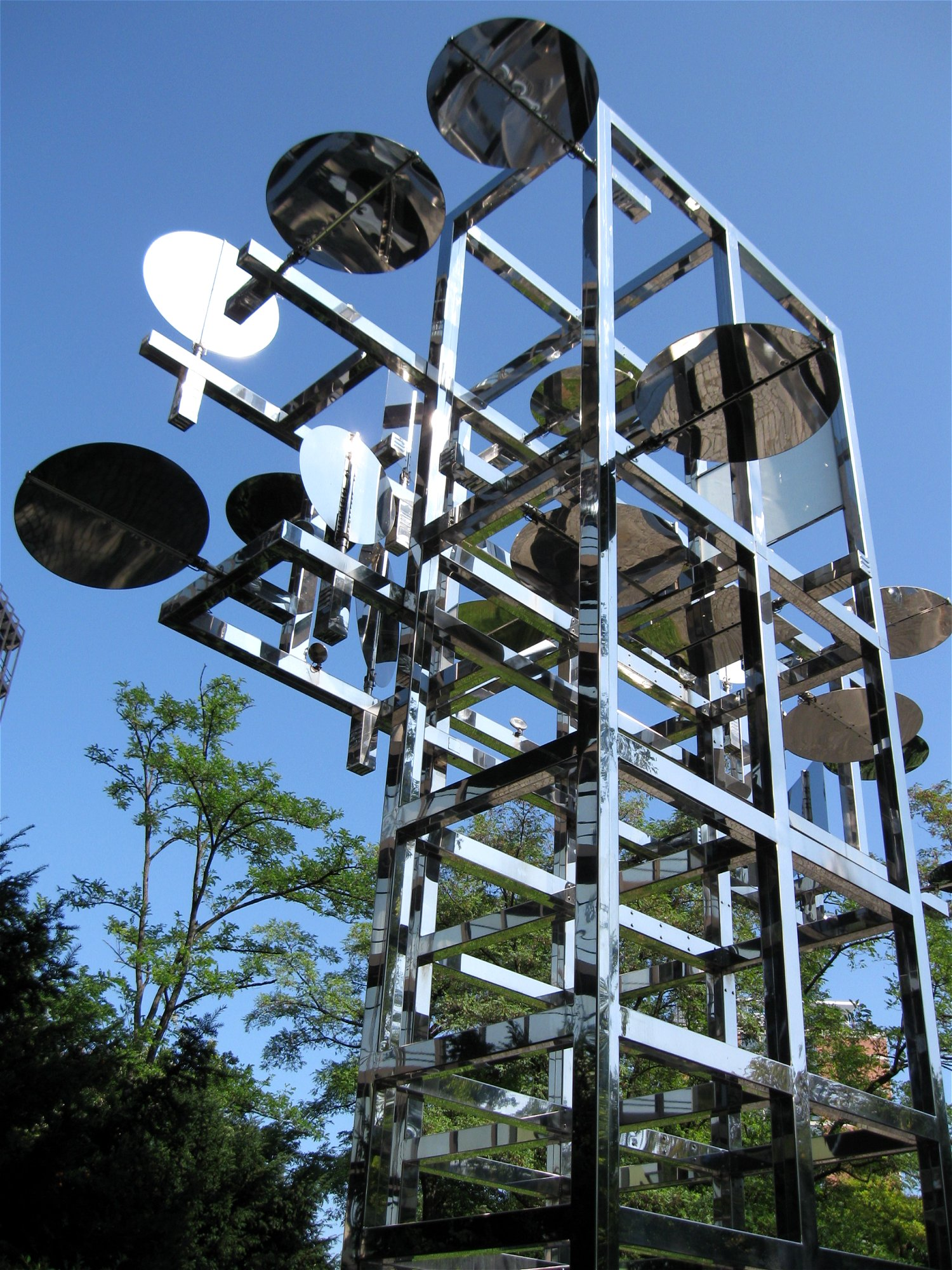
"Chronos 10B", Munich

Schöffer's main achievements emerged during the second creative period. The rapid execution of the idea, the speed of creation was his central concern. Cybernetics enabled the automation of the creative process and secured a satisfying speed of artistic production. The perception of the viewer was central to the concept of the works. His artistic practise is characterized by a harmonious combination of art, technology and science which requires teamwork. He left part of the creative process to his colleagues. In several cases he only created the algorithm and let the program conjure up the spectacle. On the other hand, he also envisaged a participatory art in which the recipient changes the work of art, redesigns it and thus becomes the creator of the work himself. He did not shy away from having some of his artworks mass-produced. He questioned the traditional function of art and designed a cybernetic city where art plays the major role and is the organisational principle of its functioning.

==== Spatiodynamism (1950-1957) ====
After a few initial sculptural works, Schöffer gave up the emphasized main view and created sculptures in which all views were of equal importance. He concentrated on the negative space within the sculpture and on the dynamic perception of the viewer as he/she moves around. The first sculptural works have a functionalist approach. Similar to the Russian constructivists, Schöffer took industrial tasks as a source of inspiration. He planned semaphores, traffic signals, airport flight control signalling systems, clocks, power line pylons, among others.

Later he abandoned real tasks and shaped the rhythm of the space. He concentrated on the negative space between the vertical and horizontal steel parts of the structure that was holding permanently fixed rectangular and circular plates. These were at first coloured, later uncoloured polished steel. All views of the sculptures became equally important.

Schöffer was able to present himself to the public in his new role as a sculptor as early as 1950. The Galerie des deux Iles organized an exhibition entitled Schöffer Plasticien, the Galerie Harriet Hubbard Ayer presented the work of Schöffer and J.M. Savage entitled Les mobiles de l'Amour. In 1951 Schöffer took part in the Salon de la Jeune Sculpture. In 1952, the Gallery Mai showed an exhibitionthe to the public the title of which, Oeuvres Spatiodynamic, already contains the expression Spatiodynamic.

He worked out the extensive theory of Spatiodynamism (1950–1957) that he explains in his first book. Most of the spaciodynamic Sculptures were still static, only a few of them were works of kinetic art. Spatiodynamic 27 called CYSP0 was the last piece of the series and a preparation to the creation of the first cybernetic sculpture of art history.

==== Luminodynamism (1957-1959) ====
The basic concept of the LUX series is similar to that of the light-space-modulator created by Moholy-Nagy, but the structure of the sculpture is different. The sculptures consist of a construction with horizontal and vertical square profiles and of the permanently fixed discs and plates. The ratio of the structure is based on the golden section. The construction is illuminated by colored and white light sources and the shadows on the walls are considered as part of the work. Schöffer also used a semi-transparent screen. This resulted in multiple possible readings of the work. Schöffer submitted the basic principle on April 14, 1956 to the patent office and it was registered on August 25, 1958 as a patent. Schöffer elaborated the theory of Luminodynamism (1957-1959) .

In these works, the play of movement and coloured lights provided an attraction that gave a completely original effect even when filmed. Schöffer shot several short films of these.

==== Chronodynamism (1959-) ====
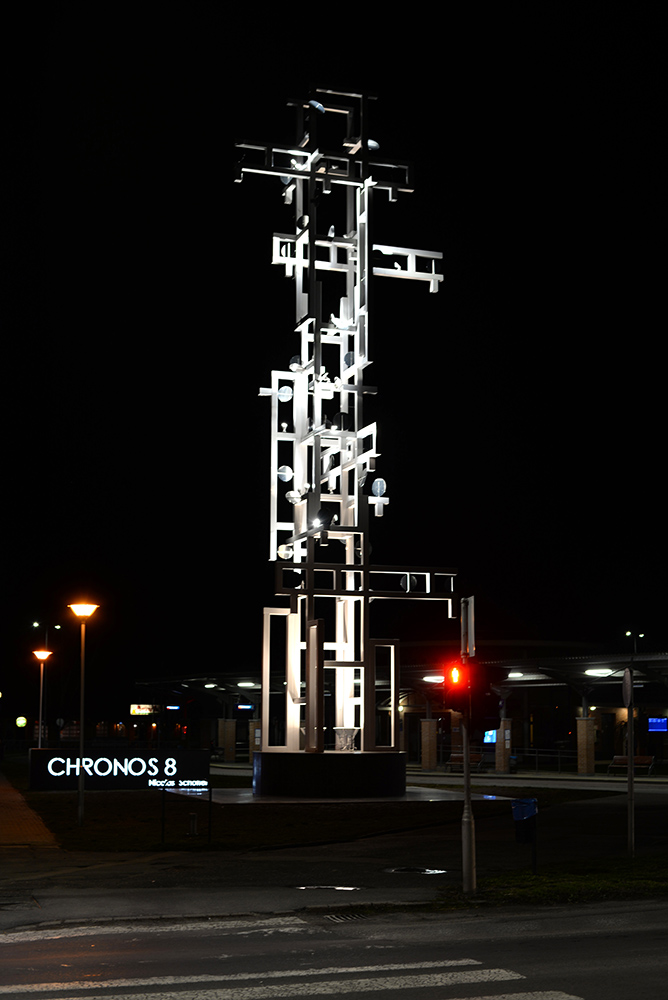
Nicolas Schöffer, Chronos 8 Cybernetic Light Tower, Kalocsa

The Microtemps (1960–1966) series challenges the capabilities of human visual perception and assesses the limitations of the related cognitive capacities. The Microtemps are small boxes, the inside of which is either painted black or white, or lined with a reflective material. Various discs, hemispherical shells and plates made of stainless steel are set in motion inside the box by a programmed motor. The speed of their rotations was adapted to the speed of the perception of an image, i.e. thirty thousandths of a second, in such a way that it challenged the recipient's cognitive capacities. The Luminos were similar with the difference that the rotating parts were shaded by a transparent screen. They were the first mass-produced works of art.

These works represent a transition from Luminodynamism to Chronodynamism. After space and light time got into the focus of the artist's attention. However, the program of the microtemps and luminos repeated itself endlessly in the same way, because it was not yet based on an algorithm. During his further artistic activity, Schöffer created sculptures using cybernetics program patterns which are never repeated. Schöffer elaborated the theory of Chronodynamism in 1959.

With the five topologies and cybernetics together, Schöffer had his full artistic arsenal ready, and the dimensions of his works began to grow. He created cybernetic light towers, the Chronos series. They can be found in several cities around the world. Chronos 8 stands in his home town near the house where he was born. Although the most accomplished and tallest cybernetic light tower that he planned for Paris was never built it is still considered as his masterpiece. It would have been taller than the Eiffel Tower and an information source for the inhabitants of Paris. It took ten years to design. The first oil crisis and the death of Pompidou thwarted the plan.

==== Final phase of the second creative period ====
Schöffer began to plan several series of cybernetic sculptures and Hydro-Thermo-Chronos Fountains to socialize art and enhance the aesthetic quality of the surroundings in the city. Several of these new ideas remained in the planning phase, after he fell ill.

He planned the first of the series Les Tour Soleil for Venezuela. These monumental solar towers consisted of sun reliefs mounted on a vertical axis. They could move around this axis on a spiral path. They stored the sun's energy during the day to use it at night. The innovation was the use of solar energy to supply the sculpture's light sources and motors with power. Plans for a 600 m high solar tower were completed for the Olympic Games in Los Angeles that took place in 1984.

Les Basculantes (1982–83) (Tumbling Sculptures) are cybernetic sculptures that lean at every moment to one side like the Tower of Pisa but they are continuously changing the direction and angle of their inclination.

The idea of the Hydro-Thermo-Chronos Fountains also dates back to 1983. These fountains would have used water, fire and lasers to evoke a spectacle on a monumental scale that would have been accompanied by strong sound effects.

The purpose of the works called Les Percussonor (1984–85) was to relieve mental tension caused by stress as a consequence of urban life. They are participatory works of art where the audience is encouraged to hit parts of the sculpture to produce sound effects.

These plans have remained in different stages of development but the ideas are clearly expressed. Posthumous realization is possible as the example of LUX 10 shows: this was built decades after Schöffer's death, in 2016 in Busan, South-Korea.

Some of Schöffer's works that were never realized, or lost, (Hydro-Thermo-Chronos Fountains, CYSP 1, SCAM1 and the TLC for Paris) were digitally reconstructed by Naomi Devil for the film Extraordinary World of Nicolas Schöffer. This was shown in the Hungarian Pavilion at the Expo 2015 in Milano, and directed by Sándor Gerebics.

=== Third creative period ===
The third creative period began after a sudden stroke of fate. After a brain hemorrhage, Schöffer's right side remained paralyzed and he used a wheelchair. Due to his deteriorating state of health, he was no longer able to handle large projects on his own. Although two projects that had already started were completed, no new works of art were created on a city scale. During this last period he created graphic works, using his left hand or with the computer. This was not a return to the ideas of the first period, which is also characterized by graphic and painterly work, but rather a synthesis of his entire career.

== Main works ==
=== CYSP1 ===
With CYSP1 Schöffer created the first cybernetic sculpture in art history in 1956. The name CYSP1 refers to the cybernetic and spatiodynamic features of the sculpture that had total autonomy of movement (travel in all directions at two speeds) as well as axial and eccentric rotation setting in motion its 16 pivoting poly-chromed plates. The sculpture made used electronic computations developed by the Philips Company. It was set on a base mounted on four rollers, which contained the mechanism and the electronic brain. The plates were operated by small motors located under their axis. Phototubes and a microphone built into the sculpture caught all the variations in the fields of color, light and sound intensity. All these changes occasioned reactions on the part of the responsive sculpture.

The sculpture was first presented in 1956 at the Sarah Bernhardt Theater in Paris during a night of poetry. That same year, at the avant-garde art festival, the dancers of Maurice Béjart's ballet company performed a ballet with CYSP1 on the terrace of Le Corbusier's Cité Radieuse complex in Marseille. The sculpture reacted to the movements of the dancers. The spectacle was accompanied by concrete music by Pierre Henry. Further performances followed in the studio of the artist at the Villa des Arts in Paris.

=== SCAM1 ===
SCAM1 was the first automobile sculpture of the art history. Traditionally, sculptures were site-specific, immobile works of art. At the beginning of the 20th century, kinetic artists created sculptures with moving parts but these still remained in the same place. CYSP1 moved around in a confined space that was marked by a black circle on the ground, but could not leave it. SCAM1 was liberated of every confinement and could travel around the city at notable speed because the 3.93 m high sculpture was mounted on a custom-made automobile financed by the gallery owner Denise René and produced by the Renault Company. SCAM1 appeared on the streets of Milan and Paris in 1973 and the spectacle attracted considerable attention. It does not exist any more; it had to be dismantled due to difficulties of parking and storage.

=== TLC Paris ===
Numerous smaller towers have been created in cities in Europe and America. The first 25 m high spatiodynamic tower was built in 1950 in Biot (France) as part of the exposition du Groupe Espace. The first spatiodynamic, cybernetic and acoustic tower was built in 1954 for the International Exhibition of Public Works in the Parc de Saint Cloud near Paris and reached a height of 50 m. The sound structure was composed by Pierre Henry. These first towers were dismantled after the exhibition.

The tallest tower to date is 52 m high and was built in Liège in 1961 in front of the Congress Palace. At the same time, Schöffer created a 1500 m^{2} light façade on the Congress Palace. Other towers followed in 1968 in Washington (Spatiodynamique 17), 1969 in Montevideo (Chronos 8), 1974 in San Francisco at the Embarcadero Center (Chronos 14), 1977 in Bonn (Chronos 15), 1980 in Munich (Chronos 10B), in Paris (Chronos 10), 1982 in Kalocsa (Chronos 8), 1988 Tour d'Ain at Pont-d'Ain (Lux 16) and Lyoneon in Lyon.

These towers differ from the tower that Schöffer planned for La Défense district in Paris not only in terms of size, but above all in terms of their category. The smaller ones are regarded as sculptures. The towers in Liège and Kalocsa can be categorized as architectural sculpture, since the use of the architectural form of a tower implies that all the abstract concepts associated with this architectural type over the centuries are included in the meaning of the work. The tower as an architectural type has taken various forms and functions throughout architectural history, but it has always been closely linked to the abstract concepts of power, surveillance and control. This is exactly what these two cybernetic light towers do. They express the power of human intellect and interactively observe and control their environment. Since the spiral of galaxies can be deduced from the golden section, the basic principle of the structure, Schöffer regarded these towers as the symbol of the Universe.

The cybernetic light tower that Schöffer designed for Paris is categorized as sculptural architecture, which means the dividing line between sculpture and architecture has been crossed. The height of the tower varied between 324 and 347 m in the different plan versions which implies that architectural and static considerations had to be in the foreground. It was planned as a building that could be entered. Schöffer envisaged seven visitor platforms that could be reached via elevators and stairs. He planned restaurants, signalling systems, television stations, concert halls with an organ, a post office, a drugstore and other shops on the platforms. The tower would simultaneously have fulfilled the functions of an information centre, art and cultural space, lighthouse, air navigation tower, weather service tower, observation tower and media tower.

Ten large French companies took part in the project and worked out the various detailed technical plans according to Schöffer's ideas. 14 concave mirrors, 363 mirrors, 144 rotatable axes with electric motors, 2085 electronic flashes, 2250 partly coloured headlights, thermometers, hygrometers and anemometers were to be mounted on the construction of vertical and horizontal steel profiles. 15 light cannons were planned at the top of the tower, the light from which would have increased the optical dimensions of the tower by two kilometres in height.

Supporters of the project included Charles de Gaulle, president of the Fifth Republic from January 1959 to April 1969, his successor Georges Pompidou, André Malraux, minister for cultural affairs, M. Prothin director of EPAD (l'établissement public pour l'aménagement de la région de la défense), and Marcel Jolly director and M. van den Putten, president of the Philips company. Unfortunately, the tower was never built because its biggest supporter, George Pompidou, died and the two oil crises shook its funding base. It is still considered Schöffer's masterpiece.

=== Voom Voom ===
The first disco with light show, the predecessor of discos in today's sense was voom voom in Saint-Tropez. It was a kind of preparation for the entertainment district of the cybernetic city. The project was accomplished by Félix Girault, the architect Paul Bertrand and Nicolas Schöffer. The interior was furnished by Schöffer and was similar to an enlarged effect box (boîte à effet). A large prism of mirrors and a light wall were used as elements of the spectacle. The walls of the room, except for the light wall, were curved and covered with mirrors. An electronic brain controlled the spectacle. Shortly after, a new voom voom disco was built in Juan-les-Pins.

Brigitte Bardot was a regular at the disco in Saint Tropez. One of the first video clips were shot with her and Schöffer's spectacle.

=== Cybernetic city ===
In March 1965, the International Group for Prospective Architecture (Groupe International d'Architecture Prospective - GIAP) was founded under the chairmanship of Michel Ragon. The founding members were Nicolas Schöffer, Ionel Schein, Yona Friedman, Paul Maymont, Georges Patrix, Michel Ragon and later the Swiss Walter Jonas also joined the group.

The group's manifesto summed up the factors why previous forms of housing and urban structures could not meet the needs of modern life and implied the need for future-oriented planning. They concluded that demographic changes, rapid technical and scientific development, the continued increase in living standards, the socialization of time, space and art, the growing importance of free time and the accelerated speed in communication all broke up the traditional structures of society.

These considerations spurred Schöffer to design the city of the future. Like Le Corbusier, who had the opportunity to design the new city of Chandigarh from scratch, Schöffer began his planning from zero.

The cybernetic city is characterized by functional separation and consists of three parts that are closely connected and coordinated by the cybernetic headquarters. One part is dedicated to work and concentration, separated from the residential and leisure areas. Schöffer distinguishes two levels of the city: a soft city and a hard city, which together make up the cybernetic city. It's similar to the terms software and hardware that together make up a computer.

Schöffer emphasizes the leading role of art in the urban planning process, everything else should be subject to artistic considerations. The city is the extension of the sculpture. His formal considerations always come from the golden ratio. In the controversy between functionalists and formalists, Schöffer takes no position on either side. Formal and functional considerations go hand in hand, based on his conviction that only the harmony of parts can ensure a functional solution.

A third key aspect is that – unlike most urban planners – Schöffer does not design the city with hard materials (like brick, concrete, etc.). He was convinced that the immaterial factors have to be shaped first and foremost. Electricity and electronics should be in the foreground during planning and the planner should shape the five topologies: space, time, light, sound and climate.

In Schöffer's city cybernetics is the pinnacle of democracy: all controls, all regulations are always carried out through the actions of the majority. From the moment there is a majority to express a wish in a cybernetic city, that majority can immediately interpret their wishes and turn them into reality.

Schöffer saw the city as a relief, to be artistically designed in such a way that the parts are in a harmonious relationship to one another. He planned a vertical city for work with high-rise buildings: a cybernetic control centre, administrative centres, a university and office buildings. In contrast to the existing real cities this part of the cybernetic city is not dense. There are vast areas between the buildings.

The residential areas of the cybernetic city are dominated by horizontality. The ribbon-like blocks of flats on pilots could be adapted to all kind of terrains. Schöffer imagined both the automatic distribution system for consumer goods and the car traffic underground.

Schöffer supposed that people will have more free time thanks to automation and cybernetic control, which is why the satisfaction of leisure demands played a central role in the planning of the cybernetic city. He planned a separate district for leisure but also every residential and working district in the cybernetic city had a smaller local leisure centre to avoid unnecessary traffic and waste of time.

Main feature of the leisure district was a Center Loisir Sexuel, a leisure centre dedicated to sexuality. In sharp contrast to a traditional brothel like Claude-Nicolas Ledoux's Oikema, it was a building dedicated to free love on equal terms. This type of building was an expression of the new conception of sexuality and relationship between the two sexes that resulted from the sexual revolution.

The Spatiodynamic Theatre is another special building designed by Schöffer for the leisure district. It is a cybernetic theatre where the spectacle has no beginning or end, but evolves continuously according to the audience's feedback. One could compare the spatiodynamic theatre with contemporary shopping and entertainment complexes.

=== Maison à cloisons invisibles ===
The theory of the fifth topology discussed climatic events and effects and focused on the optimization of climatic conditions according to the functions of the various space segments. These were planning considerations on two different scales. On the one hand, Schöffer planned climatic zones to satisfy specific needs in buildings according to function, on the other hand he took climatic phenomena into account when planning on an urban scale.

The most extreme example of a building with controlled climatic zones designed by Schöffer was shown in 1957 at the BATIMAT international public works salon in Saint-Cloud near Paris. The House with Invisible Partitions (Maison à cloisons invisibles) could also be called the House of Contrasts and is considered an experiment to satisfy the sometimes very different needs of occupants in the same house without isolating them.

The aim of the international exhibitions of the construction industry was to present forms of living that could better fit modern lifestyles than the typical old building with small, differentiated rooms. The development went in the direction of functional separation and individually used rooms. Schöffer decided to satisfy the different needs of family members in one space without physical or visual separation.

The plan was based on the observation that the older generations would generally feel comfortable in quiet, cooler rooms with a dimmed, diffuse light, while young people prefer bright and warm rooms and are not bothered by loud music.

The house with invisible partitions consisted of a round and a trapezoidal part, which were not separated from each other inside the house. Viewed from above, the floor plan resembled a keyhole. In the round part, the temperature was hot (35 °C - 40 °C) and it was very bright and noisy. The dominant hues were red and orange. In the trapezoidal part, on the other hand, the temperature was cool (18 °C - 20 °C) and the dominant colours were correspondingly cool blue tones. This part of the room was silent and the lights were dimmed. There was no visible physical separation between the two opposing spaces. A step through the boundary line between the two parts of the room led the visitor into a completely different atmosphere.

Many visitors suspected a scam until they understood how this magic worked. The trick was achieved in part by the special cladding of the walls and interior design. The thermally insulating and sound-absorbing properties of the cladding played an important role. Air circulation was carefully planned and regulated by air conditioning. The heat in the round part of the room was donated by an infrared curtain, the effect of which could only be felt locally. The lighting was also planned and executed by Phillips. Blue fluorescent actinic lamps were used in the cool part of the room. The shape of the house was derived from acoustic considerations.

=== KYLDEX1 ===
Schöffer regularly participated in theater projects. CYSP1 appeared on stage several times. Theater performances became increasingly complex culminating in cybernetic theater plays. Schöffer designed the sets for theatrical performances and fashion shows. An example was the Paco Rabanne space age fashion show titled Light and Movement that took place with a stage set designed by Schöffer in 1967 in the museum of modern art in Paris.

Cybernetics played a dual role in Schöffer's theatrical experiments. The stage was populated by robots, cybernetic towers, prisms and light effect boxes. Their operations were controlled according to cybernetic principles, and depended on an element of chance through the perceived light and sound effects. During the theater play KYLDEX1 there was a cybernetic feedback and control loop between the public and the performance.

Schöffer's first collaboration with the Hamburg State Opera was the stage design of Gian Carlo Menotti's children's opera Help, Help, the Globolinks!. Thanks to this collaboration he received a new commission for a solo theater performance applying the cybernetic principles of coupling and feedback. KYLDEX1 (KYbernetic and LuminoDynamic theater EXperiment) was presented in 1973 at the Hamburg State Opera on ten consecutive evenings.

The audience was drawn into the theatre play. The heartbeat of a dozen selected viewers was measured and used as input for the central brain. Each person in the audience received five color cards to vote. According to the decision of the majority, those present could influence the course of the spectacle. Viewers could request the sequence to be repeated, slow down or speed up the spectacle, stop the performance, and ask questions.

The spectacle was created by programming six parameter groups. The spatial parameters were partly represented by five 6.5 m high Chronos 8B-type sculptures and erotic sculptures made of inflatable plastic with a span of 2 to 4 m. The audio parameters were twofold: on the one hand, Pierre Henry's electronic concrete music, on the other hand, human voices corresponding to a word score. The parameter group human interventions consisted of dancers and a commentator. Other parameter groups were the lighting and projection screens. The sixth parameter group consisted of olfactory stimuli.

== Schöffer collection in Kalocsa ==
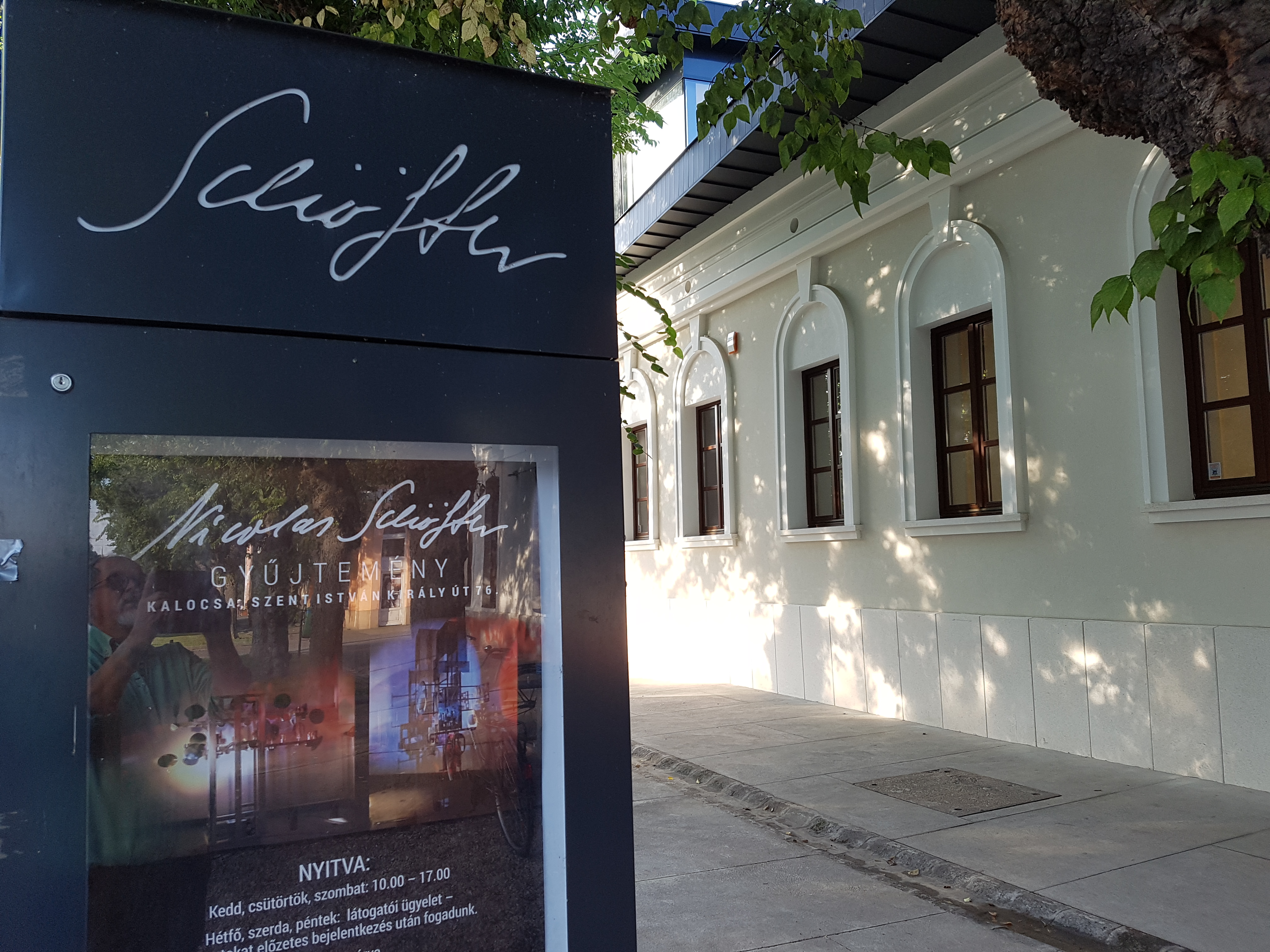
Nicolas Schöffer Collection Kalocsa, Hungary (front of the building)

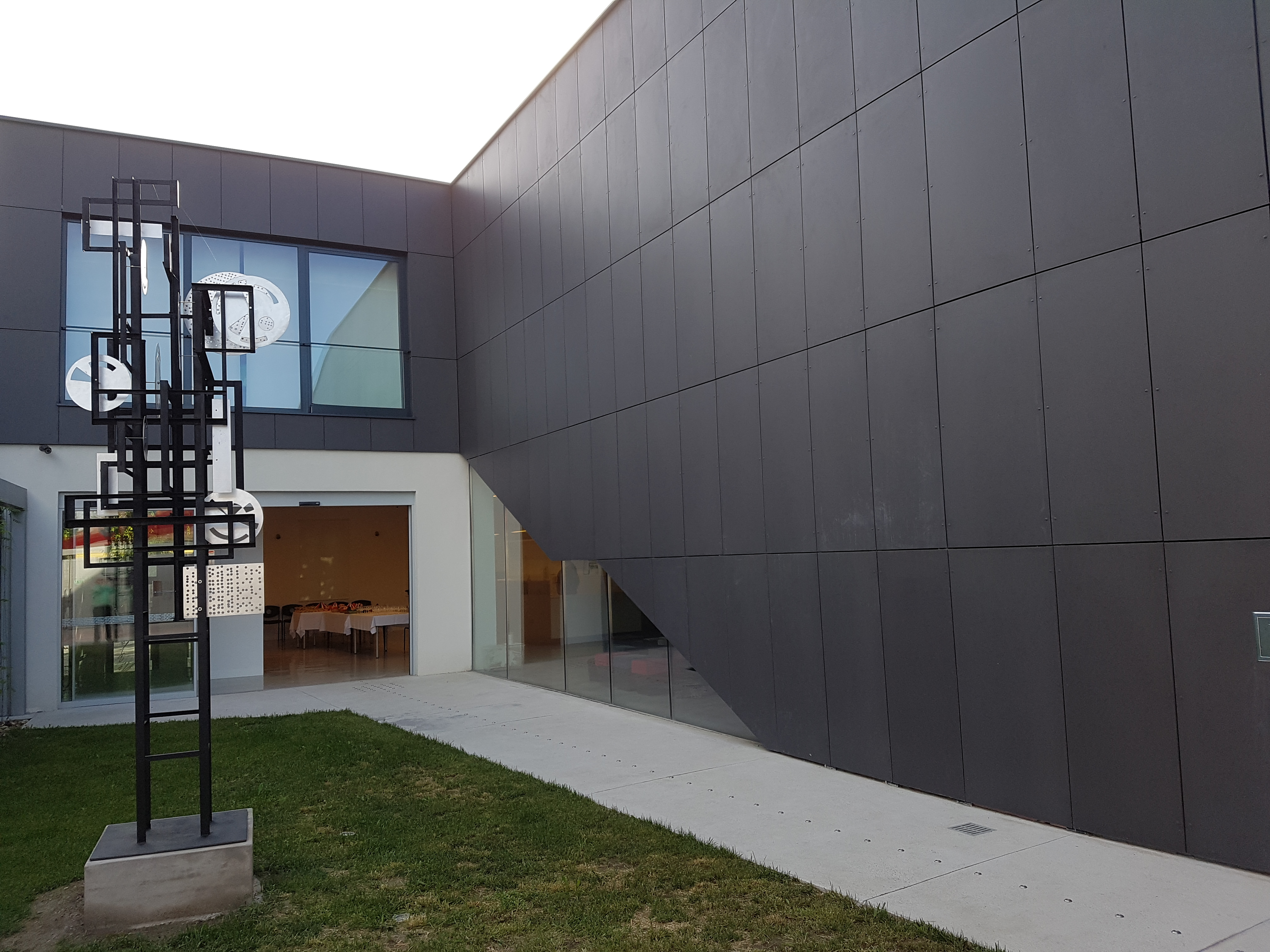
Nicolas Schöffer Collection Kalocsa in Hungary, view from the garden

Nicolas Schöffer moved to Paris in 1936. He returned to Hungary for the first time in 1976 and later often visited his native town Kalocsa. In 1979 he donated a collection of his works covering all of his creative periods. In 1980, a museum was opened in the house where he was born, and a new building was added to the museum at the rear of the garden. The new part was used for temporary exhibitions, and an apartment was reserved for Schöffer on the second floor. Eléonore de Lavandeyra Schöffer donated a French library to the museum in 1994, which was set up in the new building.

In 2015, fifteen tourist sites were developed in the city in the framework of the Heart of Kalocsa program including two sites related to Schöffer. The Chronos 8 cybernetic tower was renovated and the museum rebuilt. The old buildings were demolished and rebuilt to create a new museum which meets contemporary international standards, and now plays a major role in art education.

== Nicolas Schöffer's books ==
The most important written sources that summarize Schöffer's ideas are his own books and writings. He summarized his theories on art, architecture and urbanism in ten books.

The first book entitled Le Spatiodynamisme appeared in 1955 and contains the text of the lecture given by Schöffer in June 1954 in the Turgot amphitheater of the Sorbonne University at the conferences organized by the French society of aesthetics. In this book he defines spaziodynamism and describes his ideas about the dynamics of the interaction between sculpture and space. He redefines the role of the sculptor and the role of sculpture in urban space. He establishes a new discipline plasticosociology. Its task is to study the effects of the sculptural environment on human behavior, to enhance the city's social fabric by improving visual stimuli in the urban environment.

The books La Ville Cybernétique (1972) and La nouvelle charte de la ville summarize Schöffer's visions of the city of the future. The book Le nouvel esprit artistique contains texts and manifestos in which Schöffer explains the principles of his mature theories of spatiodynamics, luminodynamics and chronodynamics and deals with the role and task of art in our knowledge society.

The book La Tour Lumière Cybernétique describes Schöffer's cybernetic light tower that he planned for La Défensee district of Paris. Perturbation et chronocratie is a study of the disturbances that upset our mental and social structures. Schöffer questions how cybernetic awareness can progressively dominate a destabilized human destiny. He explains his view about quantity becoming quality in the course of a social revolution.

Time is linear, language is linear and thought, closely linked to language, is also linear. Schöffer asks how to escape it. The book titled La Théorie des miroirs analyzes and develops the phenomenon of inversion in all its aspects from image to thought through language.

In Surface et Espace, the last book published during his lifetime, Schöffer returns to the principles of his work and artistic creation with a dense text illustrated with drawings and colour plates, some of which were produced using the computer. The book covers works of the third creative period: choreographics and ordigraphics.

Also of note is his essay entitled Sonic and Visual Structures: Theory and Experiment, published in Leonardo in 1985. In this essay, Schöffer explains his views on music and its role in society. The Leonardo magazine was founded in 1968 in Paris by kinetic artist and astronautical pioneer Frank Malina for people interested in scientific, technological and artistic development.

== Writings about Schöffer ==
The first Schöffer monograph was published in 1963 by Edition du Griffon Swiss publishing house. After introductory words by Jean Cassou, the monograph contains two essays by Guy Habasque and Jacques Ménétrier. The photographer of the illustrations was Robert Doisneau. Accompanying the publication was a vinyl record of Pierre Henry's concrete music. Another Schöffer monograph published by Presses du réel appeared in 2004 with text by Eric Mangion and Maude Ligier. Tamás Aknai wrote a Schöffer monograph in his home country in 1975.

Various diploma theses discuss Schöffer's works from very different angles. Maude Ligier deals with the first stage of the artistic career, a phase of creative work that is rarely mentioned. Ligier analyzes the turning point in the artist's career triggered by the encounter with Wiener's book. Nathalie Busson discusses the line of development that has led from separate artworks to the complex tasks of urbanism. Orsolya Hangyel and Eszter Tamás analyze the Hungarian roots of the kinetic artistic movement including Schöffer's contribution. Andrea Rovescalli's thesis focuses on artworks that were produced in series for households, like the Lumino series. Three-dimensional digital reproduction of Schöffer's lost, or planned but never realized, works was the main concern of Ördög Anna Noémi aka Naomi Devil. Her thesis at the University of Applied Art in Vienna consists of a text and 3D models. The thesis that Klára Gehér wrote at the Technical University in Vienna provides an insight into the antecedents of Schöffer's oeuvre. It compares individual works with those of contemporaries and points out the impact of Schöffer's work on future generations of artists, and provides a starting point for curators.

== Sources ==
- Popper, Frank, From Technological to Virtual Art, Leonardo Books, MIT Press, 2007
- Busch, Julia M., A Decade of Sculpture: the New Media in the 1960s (The Art Alliance Press: Philadelphia; Associated University Presses: London, 1974); ISBN 0-87982-007-1
- Nicolas Schöffer retrospective exhibition, Műcsarnok Exhibition Hall, Budapest, Hungary, 2019
- Nicolas Schöffer retrospective exhibition, video, Műcsarnok Exhibition Hall, Budapest, Hungary, 2019
- Nicolas Schöffer in recognised database Kunstaspekte
- Nicolas Schöffer exhibition catalog, Odalys Gallery
