= Anton Henning =

German artist (born 1964)

Anton Henning (born 1964 in Berlin) is a German artist who specializes in painting, sculpture and movies.

== Life and work ==
Anton Henning lived in London until the late 1980s and then in New York City. From the mid-1990s, he had his first solo exhibitions. In 2007, along with his solo exhibition, he made a name for himself as an artistic designer of furniture and interiors.

With series of his paintings, with sculptures and light sculptures and three-dimensional wall objects to form, together with purchased or self-designed furniture, wallpaper and carpets supplemented with self-produced music, space-filling salons. This walk and usable installation that are color coordinated, in turn result in a big picture, which is called a Henning "interior".

The motives of Henning's paintings, applied in an impasto, matte painting, as well as its "interior", do not deny their style of kitsch and find inspiration in Francis Picabia and Sigmar Polke. Henning draws an amorphous, ship propeller-like signet, often fit in a hiding place in his motifs.

Anton Henning lives and works in Berlin.
