= Denis Retaillé =

Denis Retaillé (born 1953, Mayenne, France) was a professor of geography at the University of Bordeaux III and the Director of the CNRS ADES Research Unit, UMR 5186. Professor Retaillé holds a PhD in Geography from the University of Rouen (1983) dedicated to the study of the Nigerien region of Koutous, and a Habilitation from the Paris-Sorbonne University (Paris IV) (1993) dedicated to the study of space in the Sahel. From 1993 to 2008, he was a professor of geography at the University of Rouen, France.

Drawing on the work made by French geographer Jean Gallais in the Inner Niger Delta in Mali, he has contributed to the understanding of space, in particular in the Sahara and in the Sahel and also in India. Building on his African fieldworks, he developed the idea of a nomadic space and of a mobile space. More generally, he is interested in explaining the diversity of cultural representations in the globalised world. His work has contributed to the development of the epistemology of geography and is inspired by a comparative approach, as evidenced by his contribution in Le monde, espaces et systèmes, published with Marie-Françoise Durand and Jacques Lévy in 1993, and in Le monde du géographe, published in 1997.

Professor Retaillé was the Editor in Chief of L’Information géographique, a French journal.

== Career ==
- M.A. in Geography, University of Rouen (1979)
- PhD in Geography, University of Rouen (1983)
- Assistant professor, University of Rouen (1989–1993)
- Reader, Institut d’études politiques, Paris-Sciences Po (1990–1997)
- Lecturer, University of Rouen (1982–1989)
- Professor, Department of Geography, University of Rouen (1993–2008)
- Professor, Department of Geography, University of Bordeaux III (2008-2016)

== Major works ==
- Retaillé D. 2014. De l’espace nomade à l’espace mobile en passant par l’espace du contrat: une expérience théorique. Canadian Journal of African Studies 48(1): 13-28.
- Retaillé D. 2012. Les Lieux de la mondialisation, Le Cavalier Bleu, Paris.
- Retaillé D, Walther O. 2011. Spaces of uncertainty: A model of mobile space in the Sahel. Singapore Journal of Tropical Geography 32(1): 85-101.
- Retaillé D, Walther O. 2011. Guerre et terrorisme au Sahara-Sahel: la reconversion des savoirs nomades. L’Information Géographique 76(3): 51-68.
- Retaillé D. 2009. Malaise dans la géographie, l’espace est mobile, in M. Vanier (ed.) Territoires, territorialité, territorialisation. Rennes: Presses Universitaires de Rennes : 97-114.
- Retaillé D. 2007. Les échelles paradoxales du développement. Les Cahiers d’Outre Mer 238: 167-183.
- Retaillé D (dir.). 2006. La ville ou l’Etat? Développement politique et urbanité dans les espaces nomades et mobiles. Rouen: PURH.
- Retaillé D. 2005. L’espace mobile, in Antheaume B, Giraut F (eds) Le territoire est mort. Vive les territoires! Une (re)fabrication au nom du développement. Paris: IRD : 175-202.
- Retaillé D. 2000. Geopolitics in history. Geopolitics 5(2): 35-51.
- Retaillé D. 1998. L’espace nomade. Revue de Géographie de Lyon 1: 71-81.
- Retaillé D. 1997. Le monde du géographe. Paris: Presses de Sciences Po.
- Retaillé D. 1995. Structures territoriales sahéliennes. Le modèle de Zinder. Revue de Géographie alpine 2: 127-148.
- Durand M.-F, Lévy J, Retaillé D. 1993. Le monde, espaces et systèmes. Paris: Presses de Sciences Po and Dalloz.
- Retaillé D. 1993. Afrique: le besoin de parler autrement qu’en surface. EspacesTemps 51-52: 52-62.
- Retaillé D. 1989. Mobilités des populations sahéliennes pendant la sécheresse aggravée de 1984, in Bret B (ed.) Les hommes face aux sécheresses. Paris: IHEAL: 277-285.
- Retaillé D. 1986. Les structures territoriales et la sécheresse au Sahel. Cahiers Géographiques de Rouen special issue: 27-42.
- Retaillé D. 1984. La mise en place d’une région en Afrique sahélienne autour du Koutous (Niger oriental). In Blanc-Pamard, C. et al. (eds) Le développement rural en questions: paysages, espaces ruraux, systèmes agraires. Paris: ORSTOM : 181–203.
- Retaillé D. 1983. La mise en place d’une région Afrique sahélienne, autour du Koutous, Niger oriental. University of Rouen, unpublished PhD dissertation.
