= Hiroshi Sugito =

Japanese painter

Hiroshi Sugito (杉戸 洋, Sugito Hiroshi; born 1970) is a contemporary Japanese painter who has been recognized as a part of the Tokyo-Pop movement. He specializes in Nihonga painting (literally "Japanese painting"). However, instead of the traditional scenic imagery of Nihonga, his paintings focus on abstract and recognizable elements. Oftentimes his artwork consists of dreams, altered realities and childlike fantasies. They consist of both abstract and concrete elements and are also influenced by both Eastern and Western paintings. Hiroshi Sugito is Professor for Oil-Painting at the Tokyo University of the Arts (東京藝術大学)

== Early life ==
Hiroshi Sugito was born in Nagoya, Japan, in 1970. In 1993 he graduated from the Aichi Prefectural University of Fine Arts and Music. He is a former student of Yoshitomo Nara (born 1959). He joined Yoshitomo in 1997 in an exhibition entitled “Over the Rainbow”.

== Work ==
Hiroshi Sugito’s work tends to focus on Japanese painting with a Western influence. A lot of his imagery has a sense of “Kawaii”—which means "cute" in Japanese—and intertwines this idea with a sense of weirdness or eerie displacement. “I start moving my brush like walking into the woods, away from everything, and I want words and meanings to lose their power and just fade away.

== Solo exhibitions ==
Sugito has had several solo exhibitions in Japan and internationally. Some of his earlier exhibitions include:

- Kind of Blue, Hakuto-sha, Nagoya, Japan
- “Hanging” GeleriaVilaca, SaoPaolo/ Paco Imperial, Rio de Janeiro
- Heaven and Hell, Hara Museum, Gunma Tokyo Station Gallery, Japan
- Paintings and Sketches, Japan Creative Center, Singapore, 2011
- Needle and Thread at Tomio Koyama Gallery Tokyo Japan, 2011
- the orange tree, Kenji Taki Gallery, Nagoya, Aichi, Japan, 2012
- Crazy for Painting vol.9 Masato KOBAYASHI + Hiroshi SUGITO, gallery αM, Tokyo, Japan, 2013

== Group exhibitions ==
Sugito has also participated in several group exhibitions, including one with Yoshitomo Nara in 1997, titled Over the Rainbow. Other group exhibitions include Tomio Koyama Gallery, TOLOT/heuristic Shinonome, Tokyo, Japan and Birds, Beast and FlowersGalerie Zink, Berlin, Germany.
