= Douglas Kolk =

American artist (1963–2014)

Douglas Kolk (1963 – August 2014) was an American artist based in Boston, Massachusetts. He is known primarily for his drawing, as well as work in collage and mixed media.

== Early life and education ==
Kolk was born in Newark, New Jersey in 1963. Kolk's parents operated a nursing home in Newark.

== Career ==
Kolk's work has been shown internationally at galleries and museums including the Helsinki City Art Museum in Finland, Kasseler Kunstverein, Museum Frieder Burda and Kunsthalle Mannheim in Germany, Kunsthalle St. Gallen, the Saatchi Gallery and Royal Academy in London. His work features in several prominent collections including The Falckenberg Collection and the Saatchi Gallery. He was represented by Arndt & Partner in Berlin and Zurich.
