= Shi Xinning =

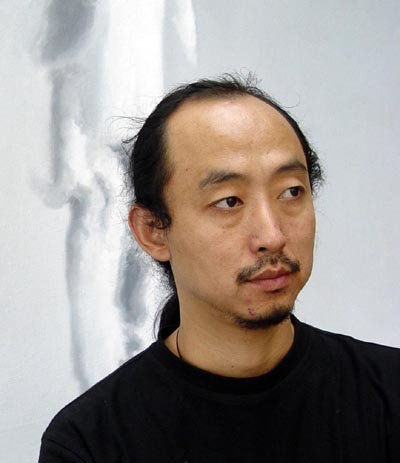
- Born: Shi Xinning; 1969 (age 56–57); Yingkou, Liaoning Province, China
- Education: Lu Xun Academy of Fine Arts in Shenyang, Liaoning Province
- Known for: Painting
- Notable work: Yalta No.2, Royal Coach, Mao and McCarthy

Shi Xinning
- Chinese: 石心宁
Transcriptions

Shi Xinning (石心宁; born 1969, in Liaoning Province, China) is a painter based in Beijing.

Influenced by both social realism and European styles, he specialises in historical paintings that insert Mao Zedong into iconic social and political photos of the 20th century - such as the Yalta Conference, the HUAC hearings, and a state procession of the British Queen Mother.

He has shown work internationally in many exhibitions including Mahjong at the Kunstmuseum in Bern, China Art Now at the Marella Gallery in Milan, China Contemporary Painting at Fondazione Carisbo in Bologna, and Landscapes at the Shanghai Gallery of Art.

He is represented by the Marella Gallery in Beijing and Milan, Shine Art Space in Shanghai, and by ARNDT in Berlin.

== Life and work ==
Shi Xinning was born in 1969, in Liaoning Province, China to his parents who were People's Liberation Army members. Xinning received a formal education in art at the Lu Xun Academy of Fine Arts in Shenyang, Liaoning Province. Xinning graduated in 1990 and continued to develop his art career for 10 years before producing his Mao paintings, which are some of his most famous.

Shi Xinning's works often contain subject matter related to the Chinese Cultural Revolution, which he experienced as a child. Some of his notable paintings are his paintings featuring Mao Zedong with people, places, or events which are entirely impossible to have occurred. Shi Xinning's work appears to deal with issues of history, cultural memory, Western Eurocentrism, and Chinese Isolationism.

One of Xinning's first Mao paintings was his painting "Duchamp Retrospective Exhibition", which portrays Mao inspecting Marcel Duchamp's famous urinal sculpture entitled "Fountain". This work injects humor through the fact that Duchamp's Dadaist expression and avant-garde art would not be permitted in China under Mao's rule, as official art in China at the time was confined to propaganda. This is also humorous because without Duchamp's "R. Mutt" signature on the urinal, Mao could just as well be inspecting a factory-made urinal for its usefulness in aiding China.

Due to the unexpected subject matter of Xinning's Mao paintings, Mao Zedong's presence often seems absurd or ironic. Mao Zedong can be seen beside celebrities Sofia Loren and Jayne Mansfield, Marilyn Monroe, Peggy Guggenheim, and even Andy Warhol. Not only is Mao represented next to notable western cultural figures and celebrities in these paintings, but he is also found attending historic events with western politicians and leaders. In Xinnings "Mao and McCarthy", for example, Mao can be seen attending the HUAC hearings, though he is not being questioned but is rather an observer. The irony of the Communist chairman Mao being a welcome observer of the hearing injects humor into the situation and establishes Shi Xinning's works as re-authorings of collective cultural memory.

Shi Xinning´s work appears in the "China Art Book", The 80 most renowned Chinese Artists, DUMONT ISBN 978-3-8321-7769-0

When referring to the purpose or meaning behind his inclusion of Mao Zedong in his paintings, Xinning cited influences from his early life in China during the Chinese Cultural Revolution. Xinning said regarding his work: "These are Shi Xinning's black-and-white visions of the way Mao's China could have been if China hadn't isolated itself from the capitalist West." Despite the anachronism present in Xinning's work, the use of Mao's image in his paintings serves to also ground his work in modern China and its surrounding culture. According to Xinning, "today Mao is still an icon in China. He is omnipresent; he defined my childhood and the lives of my parents. I never show him the real context of the 1960s or 1970s. I present him as a visual memory." Xinning has said, however, that he has little interest in Mao as a person, and instead is interested in Mao as an icon.

Xinning's artwork has seen commercial success in the art market, where his work "Mao and McCarthy" was valued in 2007 to be worth between 50,000 and 70,000 USD at auction. Shi Xinning's "Yalta" painting was valued in 2008 to be worth between 98,020 and 137,227 USD at auction.

== Visual style and themes ==
Xinning relies heavily on the usage of icons and visual themes from the Chinese Cultural Revolution, particularly the likeness of Mao Zedong. Xinning's art deals with impossibility and anachronism, as Xinning introduces Mao into impossible situations. Xinning never paints Mao in a more accurate or relevant time period or location, as Xinning entirely avoids painting Mao in the 1960s and 1970s.

The majority of Xinning's work is done in black and white, and color works usually use sepia tones. This color scheme choice by Xinning, along with his reproduction of famous press photographs from history, helps establish his "photographic" or "newspaper" style. Xinning himself confirms this interpretation of his style, as he often compares his work with that of a film director. Xinning portrays his scenes with a high level of detail, which gives his pictures a photorealistic appearance. Xinning also uses very subtle brushwork, which helps support his illusion that his paintings are historical photos.

== Exhibitions ==
The following is a list of notable exhibitions Shi Xinning has participated in.

- 2005 - The Road Map of Painting, Beijing
- 2005 - The Other Shore of This Shore, Pingyao
- 2005 - Ma Jiang, Exhibition of Mr. Uli Sigg Collection Berne, Switzerland
- 2005 - China Contemporary Painting, Marella Arte Contemporanea Bologna, Italy
- 2004 - Land_Scapes, Shanghai Gallery of Art
- 2004 - New Perspectives in Chinese Painting, Marella Arte Contemporanea
- 2004 - China's Photographic Painting, China Art Seasons, 798 Art Zone, Beijing
- 2003 - Moyemode Moyemobude, 798 Art Zone, Beijing
- 2003 - China Art Now Marella Arte Contemporanea, Milan, Italy
- 2002 - Contemporary Art Exhibition, Deduct Fabricate Copy, Beijing
- 2001 - Fake Reality, Beijing (solo)
- 1999 - Contemporary Art Show "Out-of-control", Beijing
- 1998 - Contemporary Art Exhibition, "In the City- Individuality", Beijing
- 1994 - Northeast China Contemporary Art Exhibition, Shenyang
- 1993 - China Biannual Oil Painting Exhibition, Beijing
