= Susan Turcot =

Canadian artist

Susan Turcot (born 1966) is a Canadian artist primarily known for her drawings on paper. Her work often addresses environmental issues, including deforestation.

Her work is included in the collections of the National Gallery of Canada, the Judith Rothschild Foundation collection and the Museum of Modern Art, New York.
