= Andrea Fogli =

Italian designer

- Born: Andrea Capucci Fogli; Milan, Italy
- Occupations: Product designer Interior design
- Employer(s): DOM Edizioni; Andrea Fogli Studio
- Known for: Argentario Golf Resort & Spa, among many other projects and designs
- Website: Andrea Fogli Studio

Andrea Fogli is an Italian interior and furniture designer based in Milan.

His office, Andrea Fogli Studio, is known for the originality of its hotels, restaurants and private houses projects.

== Career ==
Amongst the most important projects are: Riviera Golf Resort & Spa (2004) (), Argentario Golf Resort & Spa (2007) (), Mondial Resort & Spa (2008) and private houses in Milan and Paris.

Since 2006 he is designer and creative director for Italian furniture firm DOM Edizioni.

He is currently working on the new Excelsior Resort in Pesaro, Italy, a yacht in the Maldives Islands and private houses around Europe.

Andrea Fogli centres his works with perfect proportions, classical beauty with a certain twist, always trying to write a new screenplay for all the projects.
