= Urbanity =

Urbanity (/ˌɜːrˈbænɪtiː/) may refer to suavity, courteousness, and refinement of manner, or to urban life. It represents characteristics, personality traits, and viewpoints associated with cities and urban areas. People who can be described as having urbanity are sometimes referred to as citified. The word is related to the Latin urbanitas with connotations of refinement and elegance, the opposite of rusticus, associated with the countryside. In Latin the word referred originally to the view of the world from ancient Rome. The name Urban has been taken as a papal name by nine popes and referred to the location of the Holy See at the Vatican in Rome and the pope's status as Bishop of Rome. Urbane has a similar meaning; Oxford English Dictionary notes that the relationship of urbane to urban is similar to the relationship humane bears to human.

In language, urbanity still connotes a smooth and literate style, free of barbarisms and other infelicities. In antiquity, schools of rhetoric flourished only in the atmosphere of large cities, to which privileged students flocked from smaller cities in order to gain polish.

== See also ==
- City planning
- Henri Lefebvre
- Lewis Mumford
- Urbanism
