= Muntean and Rosenblum =

Artist duo

Muntean/Rosenblum is a collaborative artist duo composed of Markus Muntean (born 1962 in Graz, Austria) and Adi Rosenblum (Hebrew: עדי רוזנבלום; born 1962 in Haifa, Israel). They have been collaborating since 1992.

== Background ==
Adi Rosenblum and Markus Muntean met each other as students at the Academy of Fine Arts in Vienna, Austria. In 1992 they sublimated their subjective singularity into a double act, into a third person: Mutean/Rosenblum. In 1995 they founded Bricks & Kicks (1995 to 1998), one of the first Artist-Run galleries in Vienna. They were professors for Contextual Painting at the Academy of Fine Arts Vienna from 1999 to 2005 and received the nationally prestigious City of Vienna Prize for Visual Arts in 2001.

== Work ==
In the compositions of their drawings, the artist couple Markus Muntean and Adi Rosenblum use methods of sampling and resampling subjects from art history and present-day popular culture. An intensive engagement with pathos formulas of art history and the questioning of how emotions and affects expressed through them are articulated and interpreted in different eras constitute the starting point. Motifs such as those we know from Passion Cycles are applied to the psychological dispositions of contemporary existence, and partly express an apathy that calls on the empathy of the beholder. The transfer of historically overwhelming pictorial subjects into the present day triggers a discussion about the media conditions under which pictures are produced today. Through the use of language and lettering, another level enters the drawings of Muntean/Rosenblum, providing insights into the complexity of the challenges a subtle medium like drawing has to face today. In doing so, Muntean/Rosenblum also deal with the aspect of a nomadic narrative. In relation to the scenic compositions, the text collages form aphorisms that pointedly contradict phrases of popular culture, and, through their paradoxical link with figurative representations, awaken a dual consciousness.

== Exhibitions ==
=== Solo exhibitions ===
2026	Uncertainty’s Grace, Braverman Gallery, Tel Aviv
2025	Many Kinds of Silences, Einspach & Czapolai, Budapest
	Forever Is Composed of Nows, Galerie Schloss Parz, Grieskirchen, Austria
	There Is a Silence to Fill, Galerie Zink, Waldkirchen, Germany
2024	Mirror of Thoughts, Städel Museum, Frankfurt am Main
2023	Always Never Yet, Ron Mandos, Amsterdam
2021	Uncertainty’s Grace, CAC Málaga, Málaga
2020	Tell What Can Not Be Told, Viewing Room, Ron Mandos, Amsterdam
2018	This Is Not an Exit, MAC, Museo de Arte Contemporáneo, Coruña, Spain
	Walking Wounded, MOCAK, Museum of Contemporary Art, Kraków
	The White Exploit, Ron Mandos, Amsterdam
2017	Parkview Museum, Beijing
2016	Galeria Mario Sequeira, Braga, Portugal
2015	Horrach Moya, Palma
	André Simoens, Knokke, Belgium
2014	Institut für zeitgenössische Kunst, Nurnberg
2013	Bob van Orsouw, Zurich
	Philara Sammlung zeitgenössischer Kunst, Dusseldorf
2012	The Management of Insignificance, CAC Málaga, Malaga
	Team Gallery, New York
	Nemesims, Georg Kargl, Vienna
2011	Galeria Mario Sequeira, Braga, Portugal
	Sommer Contemporary Art, Tel Aviv
2008	Between what was and what might be, Essl Museum, Klosterneuburg/Vienna
2007	Arario Gallery, Seoul
	Make death listen, Galerie für Zeitgenössische Kunst, Leipzig
2006	Make death listen, MUSAC, Museo de Arte Contemporáneo de Castilla y León, León, Spain
	Shroud, Centre d’Art Santa Mònica CASM, Barcelona
	Arndt & Partner, Zurich
	We live in a twilight, Kunsthalle Budapest, Budapest
2005	Disco, Maureen Paley, London
	Jack Hanley, San Francisco
	Far Away From Why, Arndt und Partner, Berlin
	Viennale 2005, Gartenbau Kino, Vienna
2004	It Is Never Facts That Tell, Tate Britain, Art Now, London
	How Soon Is Now, Georg Kargl, Vienna
	Being in and out of love too many times makes it harder to love, Australian Centre for Contemporary Art, Melbourne
2003	''There Is A Silence To Fill'', Salzburger Kunstverein, Salzburg
	''Not to be. Not to be at all'', Porsche Hof, Salzburg
2002	To Die For, De Appel, Amsterdam
	billboards, Kunsthaus Bregenz, Bregenz
	Sommer Contemporary Art, Tel Aviv
2001	Maureen Paley, Interim Art, London
	Art & Concept, Paris
	Chicagoprojectroom, Los Angeles
2000	Where Else, SECESSION, Vienna
	I always tell you the truth unless of course I am lying to you, Kunsthaus Glarus, Glarus, Switzerland
	Minoritengalerie, Graz
	Susanna Kulli, St. Gallen, Switzerland
	Jack Tilton, New York
	Magazin 4, Bregenz
1999	Georg Kargl, Vienna
	Galleria Franco Noero, Turin
	MWMWM, Brooklyn/New York
	Chicago Project Room, Chicago
1998	Lonley Facts, Kunsthalle Luckenwalde, Luckenwalde, Germany
1997	Slaymobil, City Racing Gallery, London
	Slaymobil, Galerie Shift, Berlin
	People Forever, Kunstverein Ludwigsburg, Ludwigsburg, Germany
1996	Body Shop, Galerie Kidmat Eden, Tel Aviv

=== Gruppenausstellungen (Auswahl) ===
2026	Let’s be Realistic, Let’s Demand the Impossible, MUZEU – Pensamento e Arte Contemporânea dst, Braga, Portugal
	Open Field, Nahum Gutman Museum of Art, Tel Aviv
	Mädchen* sein – Vom Tafelbild zu Social Media, LENTOS Kunstmuseum, Linz, Austria
	Gott hat kein Museum, KULTUMUSEUM, Graz, Austria
	My World on Fire, kunsthaus muerz, Mürzzuschlag, Austria
2025	La Bella Estate, Fondazione Sandretto Re Rebaudengo, Turin
	Meditations – Things for Your Self, Kunsthalle Trier, Trier, Germany
	Der Nachmittag eines Gärtners, Kunstverein Eisenstadt, Eisenstadt, Austria
	From Cindy Sherman to Francesco Vezzoli. 80 Contemporary Artists, Giuseppe Iannaccone Collection, Palazzo Reale, Milano
2024	Blurring Boundaries, Braverman Gallery, Tel Aviv
	Garden. The Possibility of Life, HAB Museum, Budapest
	In aller Freundschaft, Dom Museum, Vienna
2023	TechnoCool. New Trends in Hungarian Art after the Fall of Communism 1989-2001, Hungarian National Gallery, Budapest
	No Promises, No Demands, Van Horn, Dusseldorf
	2000er Bye- Bye Zuversicht, Wien Museum MUSA, Vienna
2022	Que te seja leve o peso das estrelas, Centro de Arte de Coimbra, Coimbra, Portugal
	Stories We Live With – Selection from the Somlói-Spengler Collection, Q Contemporary, Budapest
	This We Believe, 21c Museum, Durham, USA
	Avantgarde und Gegenwart, Belvedere 21, Vienna
	small medium large, EVN Sammlung, Maria Enzersdorf, Austria
2021	Wonderland, Albertina Modern, Vienna
	Was sein wird – Von der Zukunft zu den Zukünften, Kunsthaus Graz, Graz
	Wilde Kindheit – Ideal und Realität von 1900 bis heute, LENTOS Kunstmuseum, Linz
	Auf zu Neuem, Landesgalerie Niederösterreich, Krems, Austria
	Schwarz Weiß & Grau, Albertina, Vienna
2020	In Search of the Miracolous, Project Space On The Inside, Amsterdam
	Changez! Art Brussels in Amsterdam, Ron Mandos, Amsterdam
	Contemporary Models of Realism, MOCAK, Kraków
2019	Trouble in Paradise, Kunsthal Rotterdam, Rotterdam
	Intriguing Uncertainties, The Parkview Museum, Beijing
	A New Age: The Spiritual in Art, Tel Aviv Museum of Art, Tel Aviv
	8th Moscow International Biennale of Contemporary Art 2019, New Tretyakov Gallery, Moskow
2018	Glaube Liebe Hoffnung, Kunsthaus Graz, Graz
	Unexpected Narratives, Norton Museum of Art, West Palm Beach, USA
	Island in the Sun, Centro Cultural São Lourenço, Almancil, Portugal
	Intriguing Uncertainties, Parkview Museum, Singapore
2017	Imaginary Asia, Nam June Paik Art Center, Gyeonggi-do, Korea
	Oh…Jakob Lena Knebl und die mumok Sammlung, mumok, Vienna
	Spiegelnde Fenster - Reflexionen von Welt und Selbst, 21er Haus, Vienna
2016	Intriguantes Incertitudes, Musée d'art moderne et contemporain, Saint-Étienne, France
	Once in a Lifetime, Oude Kerk, Amsterdam
	Collection 6, MOCAK, Kraków
	L’arte differente, MAXXI, Rome
2015	Drawing Now, Albertina, Vienna
	Dialog der Meisterwerke, Städel Museum, Frankfurt am Main
2013	Nachbilder, Sammlungsausstellung, Stiftung Galerie für Zeitgenössische Kunst, Leipzig
2012	Die Sammlung, 21er Haus, Vienna
	Una Mirada Multiple. Selecciones de la Colección Ella Fontanals-Cisneros, Museo de Bellas Artes, Havana Biennial, Havana
2011	Körper Codes, Museum der Moderne, Salzburg
2010	Lust und Laster. Die sieben Todsünden von Dürer bis Nauman, Kunstmuseum Bern in Kooperation mit Zentrum Paul Klee, Bern
	No New Thing Under The Sun, Royal Academy, London
2009	Being in the World: Selections from the Ella Fontanals-Cisneros Collection, Cisneros fontanals art foundation, Miami
	Globalizados/Globalized, Huesca’s Periferias Festival, MUSAC, Museo de Arte Contemporáneo de Castilla y León, León, Spain
2008	System Mensch. Werke aus der Sammlung des MdM Salzburg, Museum der Moderne, Salzburg
	Freundliche Feinde / Friendly Enemies, Galerie für Zeitgenössische Kunst, Leipzig
2007	art_clips.ch.at.de, ZKM, Karlsruhe, Germany
2006	ARS 06, Museum of Contemporary Art Kiasma, Helsinki
	The Triumph of Painting V, Saatchi Gallery, London
	Painting Codes, Galleria Comunale d’Arte Contemporanea, Monfalcone, Italy
2005	Homeland is just around the corner. Contemporary Austrian Photography, MARCO, Museo de Arte Contemporáneo, Vigo, Spain
	Urban Visuals, Museum of Contemporary Art Kiasma, Helsinki
2004	26. São Paulo Biennale, São Paulo
	New Blood, Saatchi Gallery, London
	Busan Biennale 2004, Busan, Korea
	Seven Sins, MUSEION, Museum für Moderne und Zeitgenössische Kunst, Bozen, Italy
2003	Young Israeli Art, Tel Aviv Museum of Art, Tel Aviv
	Taktiken des Ego, Lehmbruck Museum, Duisburg, Germany
2002	Contemporary Art Projects, Seattle Art Museum, Seattle
	Figur/Gegenfigur, Rupertinum Salzburg, Salzburg
	Das Neue, Österreichische Galerie Belvedere, Vienna
2001	2. berlin biennale, Berlin
	Guarene Arte 2001, Fondazione Sandretto Re Rebaudengo, Turin, Italy
2000	Fantasies and Curosities, Miami Art Museum, Miami

== Collections ==
- MoMA, Museum of Modern Art, New York
- Zabludowicz Collection, London, New York
- Susan and Michael Hort, New York
- Ella Fontanals-Cisneros Collection, Miami
- Rubell Family Collection, Miami
- Dicke Collection, Ohio
- The Progressive Art Collection, Ohio
- Burger Collection, Hong Kong
- Belvedere 21er Haus, Vienna, Austria
- Albertina, Vienna, Austria
- EVN Collection, Austria
- Museum of Applied Arts, Vienna (MAK), Vienna, Austria
- MUMOK, Museum of Modern Art Foundation Ludwig Vienna, Vienna
- Essl Museum, Klosterneuburg, Austria
- Museum der Moderne Salzburg, Austria
- Neue Galeri, Graz, Austria
- Bank Austria Kunstforum Wien|Sammlung BA-CA, Vienna
- Galerie für Zeitgenössische Kunst Leipzig, Germany
- Museum Kunstpalast, Düsseldorf, Germany
- DekaBank Collection, Frankfurt, Germany
- Tel Aviv Museum of Art, Tel Aviv, Israel
- Advaney Collection, The Hague, Netherlands
- MOCAK, Museum of Contemporary Art Krakau, Poland
- Ellipse Foundation, Alcoitčo, Portugal
- MUSAC, Museo de Arte Contemoráneo de Castilla y Léon, Léon, Spain
- ARCO Foundation, Madrid, Spain
- Coleccion Inelcom Arte Contemporaneo, Madrid, Spain
- VAC - Colección Valencia Arte Contemporánea, Valencia, Spain
- Swiss Re Collection, Zurich, Switzerland

== Bibliography (selected) ==
- Klaus Albrecht Schröder, Elsy Lahner, Albertina Wien (Hgs.): Drawing Now, Hirmer Verlag, Wien/München 2015, ISBN 978-3-7774-2408-8
- Karl-Josef Pazzini (Hg.): Bildung vor Bildern: Kunst - Pädagogik - Psychoanalyse (Theorie Bilden), transcript 2015, ISBN 3837632776
- Fernando Huici, Gestión Cultural y Comunicación, S.L (Hgs.): Muntean/Rosenblum, The Management of Insignificance, Centro de Arte Contemporáneo Málaga 2013, ISBN 978-84-939376-8-3
- Essl Museum (Hg.), Muntean/Rosenblum: Between What Was and What Might Be, Essl Museum 2008, ISBN 978-3-902001-46-7
- Arndt & Partner Berlin/Zurich (Hg.): Muntean/Rosenblum, Kerber Verlag, 2008, ISBN 978-3-86678-167-2
- Ulf Meyer (Hg.): Double Act. Künstlerpaare, Prestel Verlag, München/Berlin/London/New York 2007, ISBN 978-3791338477
- JRP Editions (Hg.): Markus Muntean /Adi Rosenblum – Make Death Listen, JRP Ringier Kunstverlag 2006, ISBN 978-3-905701-99-9
- De Appel, Adam Szymczyk (Hgs.): Muntean/Rosenblum – To Die For, De Appel Centre for Contemporary Art, Amsterdam 2002, ISBN 9789073501577
- Uta Grosenick, Burkhard Riemschneider (Hgs.): Art now, Taschen Verlag 2002, p. 316–319, ISBN 3-8228-1444-X
- Thomas Trummer (Hg.): Das Neue, Österreichische Galerie Belvedere, Wien 2002
- Lóránd Hegyi (Hg.): Aspekte/Positionen: 50 Jahre Kunst in Mitteleuropa 1949–99, Museum Moderner Kunst Stiftung Ludwig, Wien 1999, ISBN 3900776849
- Secession (Hg.): Muntean/Rosenblum, Secession, Wien 2001, ISBN 3-901926-20-8
- Peter Weiermair, Andreas Hapkemeyer (Hgs.): Figuration, Ursula-Blickle-Stiftung 1999, p. 66–69, 96, 107, ISBN 3-905597-09-8
