= IKOB International Art Centre East Belgium =

Coordinates: 50.626°N 6.0302°E

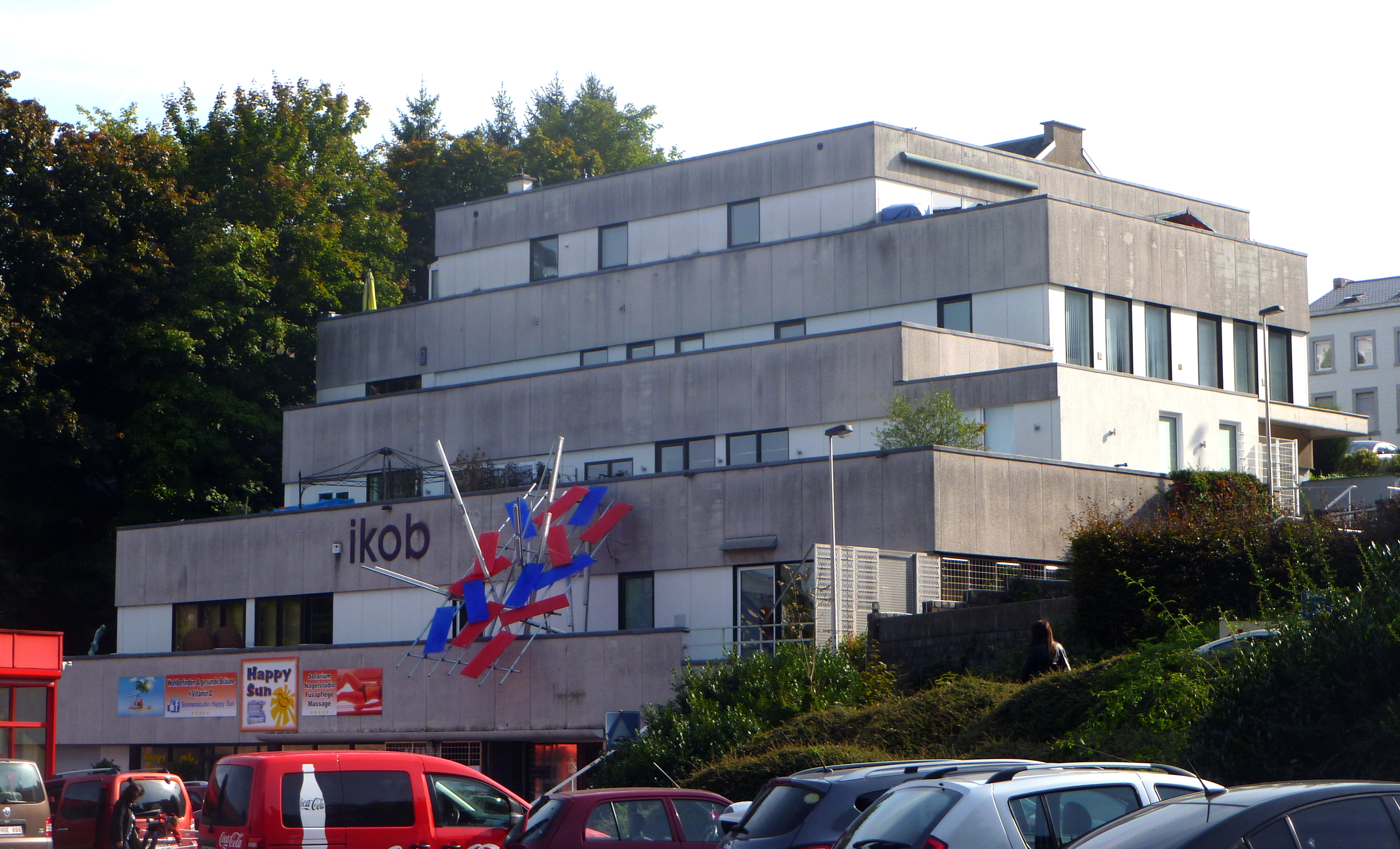
IKOB, Eupen

The IKOB Museum of Contemporary Art is a cultural institution in the Province of Liège (Belgium). It is situated in Eupen, the largest city in the German-speaking Community of Belgium. It was founded in 1993 by Francis Feidler as the "IKOB - International Art Centre of East Belgium" and was renamed to its current name in 2005. Since then, the IKOB is the only recognised art museum in the German-speaking Community of Belgium. IKOB is an abbreviation for "Internationales Kunstzentrum Ostbelgien in Eupen".

== History ==
After the Eupen abattoir located on the Rotenbergplatz was closed down in the early 1990s, plans were made to convert it into a cultural centre. The executive of the German-speaking Community together with the freelance art teacher Francis Feidler founded the "IKOB - international art centre of East Belgium" on 16 February 1993, which was as an umbrella organisation for the coordination and reorganisation of the Eupen cultural scene in the field of contemporary art. Due to a lack of permanent premises in the first few years, exhibitions and events were organised in public parks or in temporarily rented premises.

The IKOB was able to garner international attention through the sculpture exhibition Kontakt 93 that took place at the opening in 1993, in which, among others, the works of Guillaume Bijl, Jacques Charlier, Ann Veronica Janssens, Bernd Lohaus and Berlinde De Bruyckere were shown. The IKOB gained further international attention with the exhibition "Volle Scheunen" (Full Barns) in 1997 as renowned artists such as Tony Cragg, Ugo Dossi, Wolfgang Nestler, Maik and Dirk Löbbert or Marie-Jo Lafontaine agreed to exhibit at the IKOB, under the encouragement of the documenta organiser Manfred Schneckenburger.

In 1999, the IKOB was able to rent permanent premises, using its own funds to set up a former warehouse as an exhibition space. This enabled the IKOB to build up its own collection from 2003 onwards. As of 2021, the collection includes more than 400 works by renowned artists from Belgium, the Netherlands, France, Luxembourg and Germany, including for example Günther Förg, Joachim Bandau and Kati Heck. This collection was presented in 2008 at the Centre for Fine Arts in Brussels, at the Museum of Young Art in Vienna and in 2009 at the Museum van Bommel van Dam in Venlo as "The IKOB Collection - in progress". In 2010, the IKOB was able to enlarge, remodel and expand its premises, creating space for the IKOB collection as a permanent exhibition as well as for the annual temporary exhibitions.

At the beginning of 2013, French art historian and curator Maïté Vissault took over from Francis Feidler as director of the IKOB. After curating her last exhibition at the IKOB in 2015 together with Marcel Berlanger and Adrien Lucca, she moved to Brussels, where she became director of the Institut supérieur pour l'étude du langage plastique (ISELP) in Brussels.

The German art scholar Frank-Thorsten Moll was engaged as her successor at the IKOB from 2016 onwards. He introduced, among other things, the "Artists' Talks" and the series "Moll meets", in which well-known personalities are interviewed in a relaxed setting, including Gerhard Thiele (2016), Herbert Ruland and Klaus Sames (2017). Likewise, he opened the IKOB to performances of smaller chamber theatre pieces, such as the 2016 play "Die Gerechten" (The Just Assassins) by Albert Camus with actors from the Euro Theater Central Bonn. Furthermore, the IKOB has organised musical performances such as the concert Pictures at an Exhibition in an arrangement for wind quintet and piano in collaboration with the OstbelgienFestival in 2017, the concert "Glorious Bodies" with Paul Pankert in 2017 and the Meakusma Festival in 2017 and 2019. Numerous workshops, family Sundays, film screenings (among others as part of the project "docfest on tour"), as well as readings and lectures have taken place and continue to take place at the IKOB.

== Temporary exhibitions ==
Since its opening, and especially since it moved into its own premises, the IKOB has organised a number of temporary solo and group exhibitions in addition to showing its permanent collection. In 2012, works by Horst Keining and Alice Smeets, Luc Tuymans, Anne-Mie van Kerckhoven, Roger Raveel and Jonathan Meese (whose artwork the IKOB was the first Belgian institution to present) were exhibited, as well as works by Jan Fabre and Paul Schwer (2013), Ulrike Rosenbach (2014) and Jürgen Claus (2016) in the subsequent years. The exhibition "Assange Situation - Emergency" by the Greek artist Miltos Manetas took place in February 2021.

Under the direction of Frank-Torsten Moll, yearly themes were introduced. The theme of 2017 was "Resentment", while the theme of 2018 was "Pragmatism and Self-Organisation". In 2019, the museum focused on the theme of "Feminism" and examined its own collection in terms of gender equality.

== IKOB Art prize ==
Since 2005, the international "IKOB Art Prize for Young Visual Artists and Women Artists" up to the age of 45, endowed with up to €5000, has been awarded as a rule every three years, and from 2011 onwards every four years. Subsequent prize winners have included Stefanie Klingemann (2005), Ralph Cüpper (2008) and Kati Heck (2011). In 2015, there were two categories, one prize being awarded in the category "Meuse-Rhine Euroregion", endowed with €3000, and another being awarded in the category "International", endowed with €5000 .

In 2019, the prize was renamed as the "IKOB Art Prize for Feminist Art". This prize is the world's first prize for "feminist art" that appeals to both female and male artists. The winner of the 1st prize was the English video artist Helen Anna Flanagan. Other prize winners were Julia Lübbecke and Andrea Radermacher-Mennicken.
