= Admiral Freebee =

Belgian singer-songwriter

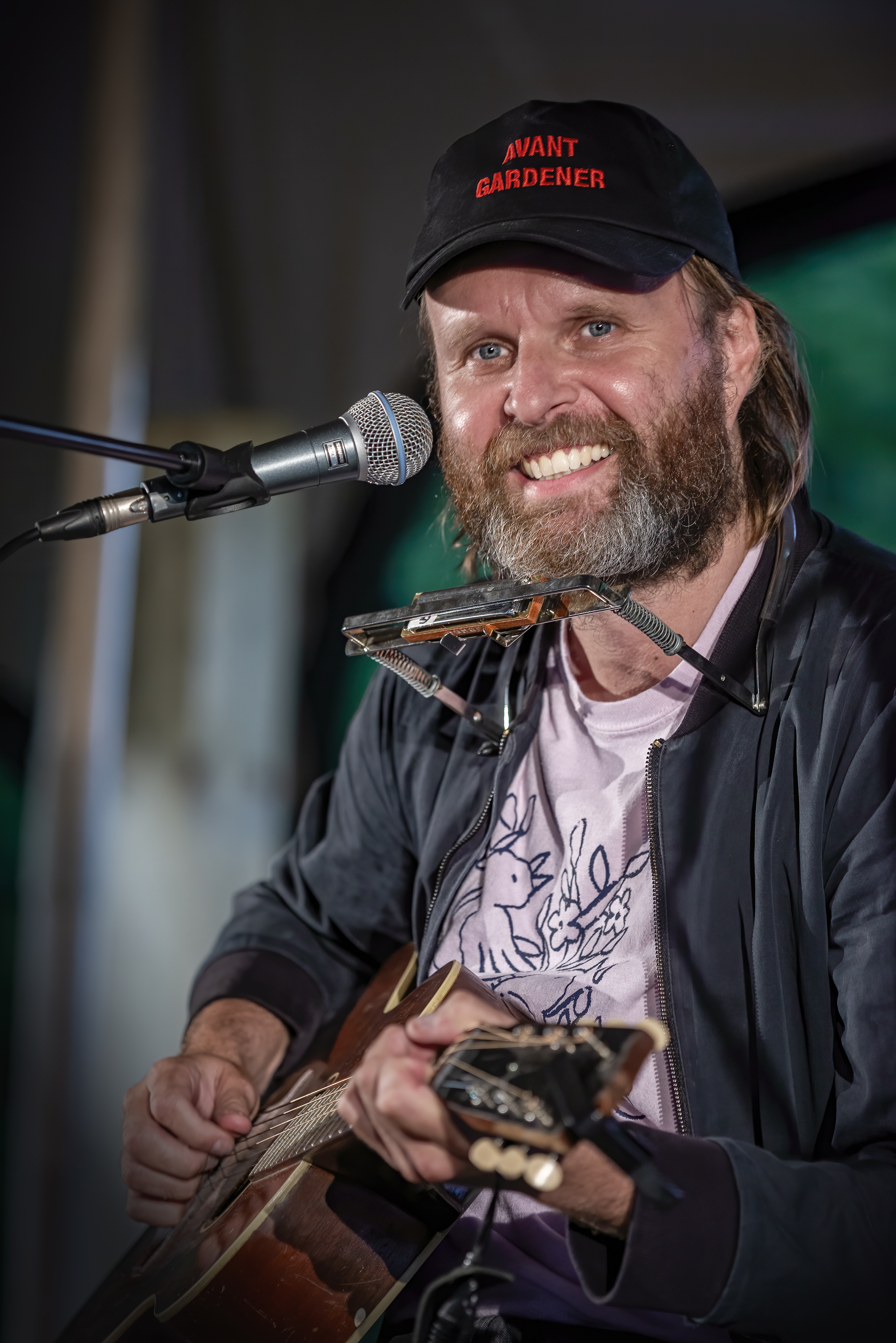
- Admiral Freebee in 2021 in Horst

Background information
- Born: Tom Van Laere; 1975 (age 50–51); Brasschaat, Belgium
- Origin: Antwerp, Belgium
- Genres: Rock, blues-rock, country
- Occupations: Musician, singer-songwriter
- Instruments: Vocals, guitar, piano
- Years active: 2000–present
- Label: Universal Music
- Website: admiralfreebee.be

Tom Van Laere (born 1975), better known by his stage name Admiral Freebee, is a Belgian singer-songwriter. He took his stage name from the Jack Kerouac novel On the Road. Admiral Freebee is also the name of a ship that sank in San Francisco Bay and was subsequently used as a buoy. Tom Van Laere is the brother of Tim Van Laere, founder of Tim Van Laere Gallery. The gallery represents Adrian Ghenie, Kati Heck, Rinus Van de Velde, Jonathan Meese, Ben Sledsens and Franz West among others.

== History ==
Van Laere was born in Brasschaat, near Antwerp. He participated in Humo's Rock Rally, one of the biggest rock competitions in the Low Countries. Backed by a bass guitarist and a drummer he was awarded the silver medal and won the audience's vote. His first album, Admiral Freebee, appeared soon after the competition on Universal, as did his second, Songs.

His third album, Wild Dreams of New Beginnings, has been released to positive critical acclaim in November 2006 and reached the top 40 on the Belgium charts.

Recently one of Belgium's most influential rock formations, dEUS, asked Admiral Freebee to be the supporting act on their European tour. In June 2009 Admiral Freebee was the support act for Neil Young on several European tour dates. Admiral Freebee also supported Neil Young at the Lokerse Feesten in 2014.

An acoustic album, A Duet for One was released in 2017. Admiral Freebee were forced to reinvent themselves before the release of their seventh album. An arm injury eventually led to the well-received album 'The Gardener'.

== Discography ==
Albums
Admiral Freebee	2003
Songs	2005
Wild Dreams of New Beginnings	2006
The Honey and The Knife	2010
The Great Scam	2014
Wake Up and Dream	2016
The Gardener	2021
Raw Fun	2026
Singles
"Ever Present" / "There's a Road" (Noorderlaan)	2002
"Rags 'n' Run"	2002
"Mediterranean Sea"	2003
"Always on the Run"	2010
Promo singles
"Recipe for Disaster"	2005
"Lucky One"	2005
"Oh Darkness"	2005
"Carry On"	2005

== The Admiral Freebee Freighter ==
According to Jack Kerouac in On the Road, Admiral Freebee is also the name of a ship that sank in San Francisco Bay and was subsequently used as a buoy.

"There was an old rusty freighter that was out in the bay that was used as a buoy." Jack Kerouac – On The Road – Part I – Chapter 11 – Page 73 – Penguin Books – 1976.

"And I never spent the night on the old ghost ship- the Admiral Freebee it was called..." Jack Kerouac – On The Road – Part I – Chapter 12 – Page 80 – Penguin Books – 1976.
