= Horst Keining =

German painter

Horst Keining (born February 9, 1949, in Hattingen at River-Ruhr) is a German visual artist.

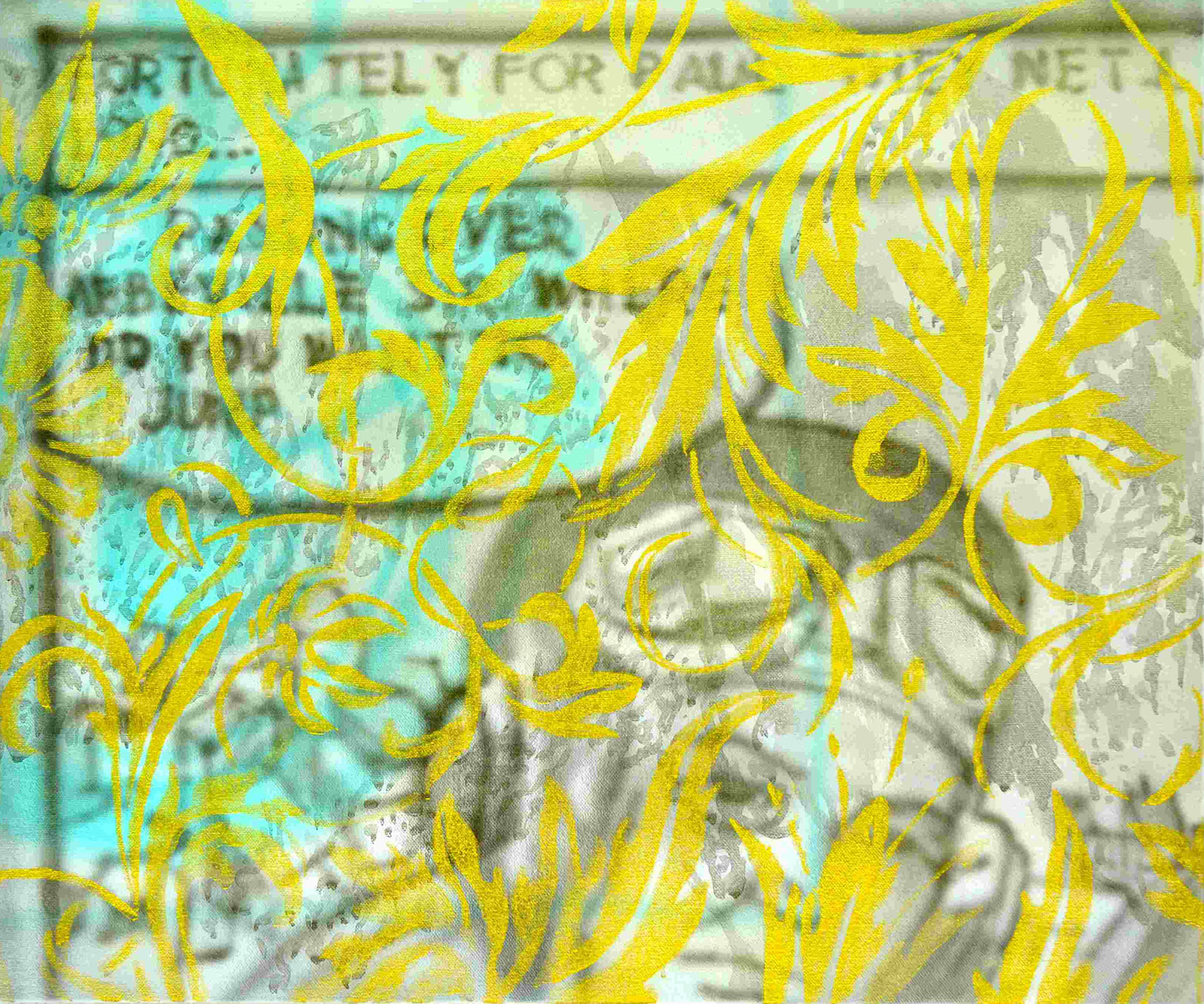
Horst Keining-Fortuna, 75 cm x 90 cm, resin on canvas, 2012, Copyright W. Rieger and the artist

== Early life and education ==
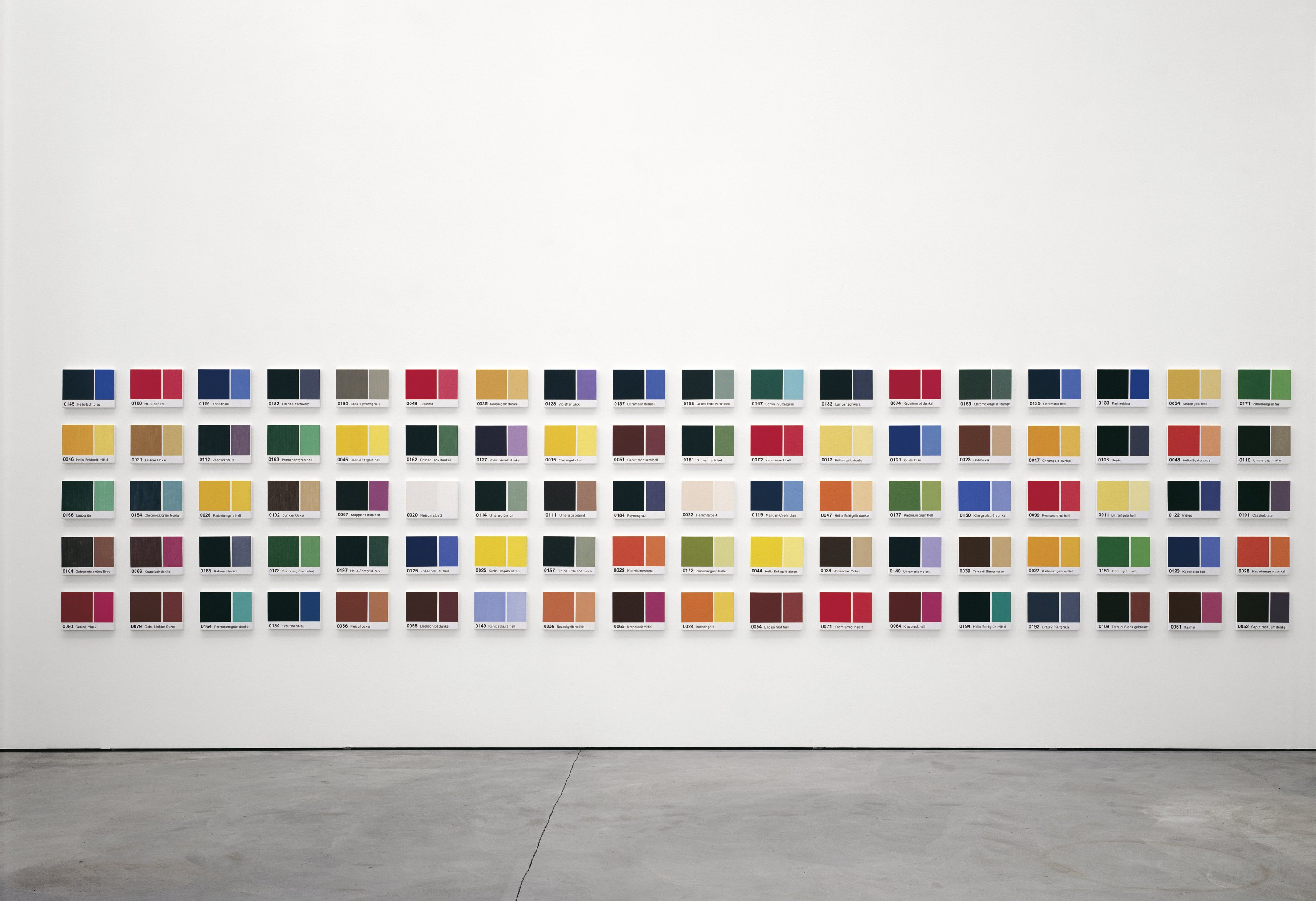
Horst Keining-90-Lukas-plates, each 24,3 cm x 33,1 cm, 2000, 2002 at Kunsthalle Lingen, Copyright Achim Kukulies and the artist

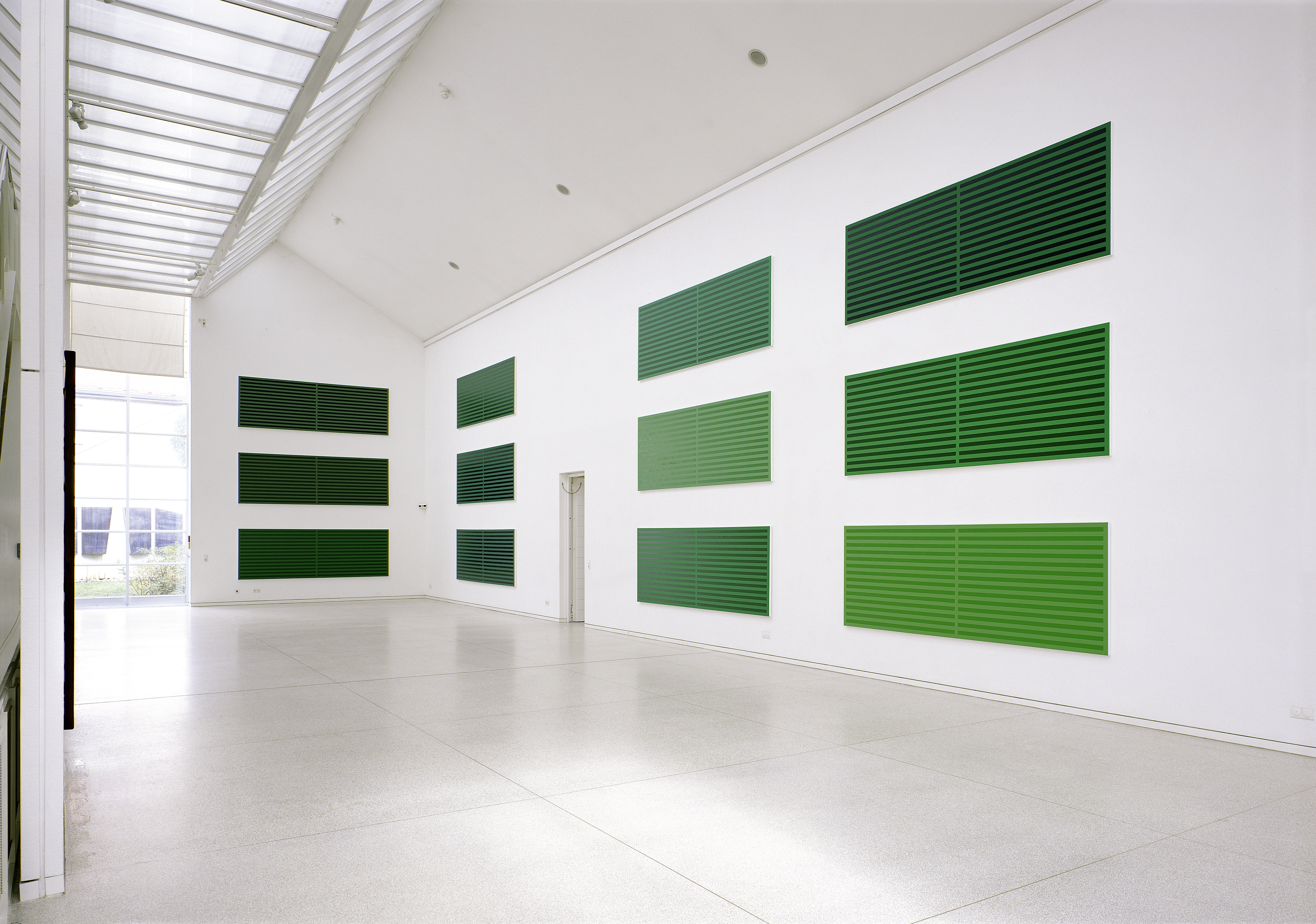
Horst Keining - Streifenbilder (Stripe paintings), each 110 cm x 320 cm, oil on canvas, 1996 at Art Association, 1998, Copyright Norbert Faehling and the artist

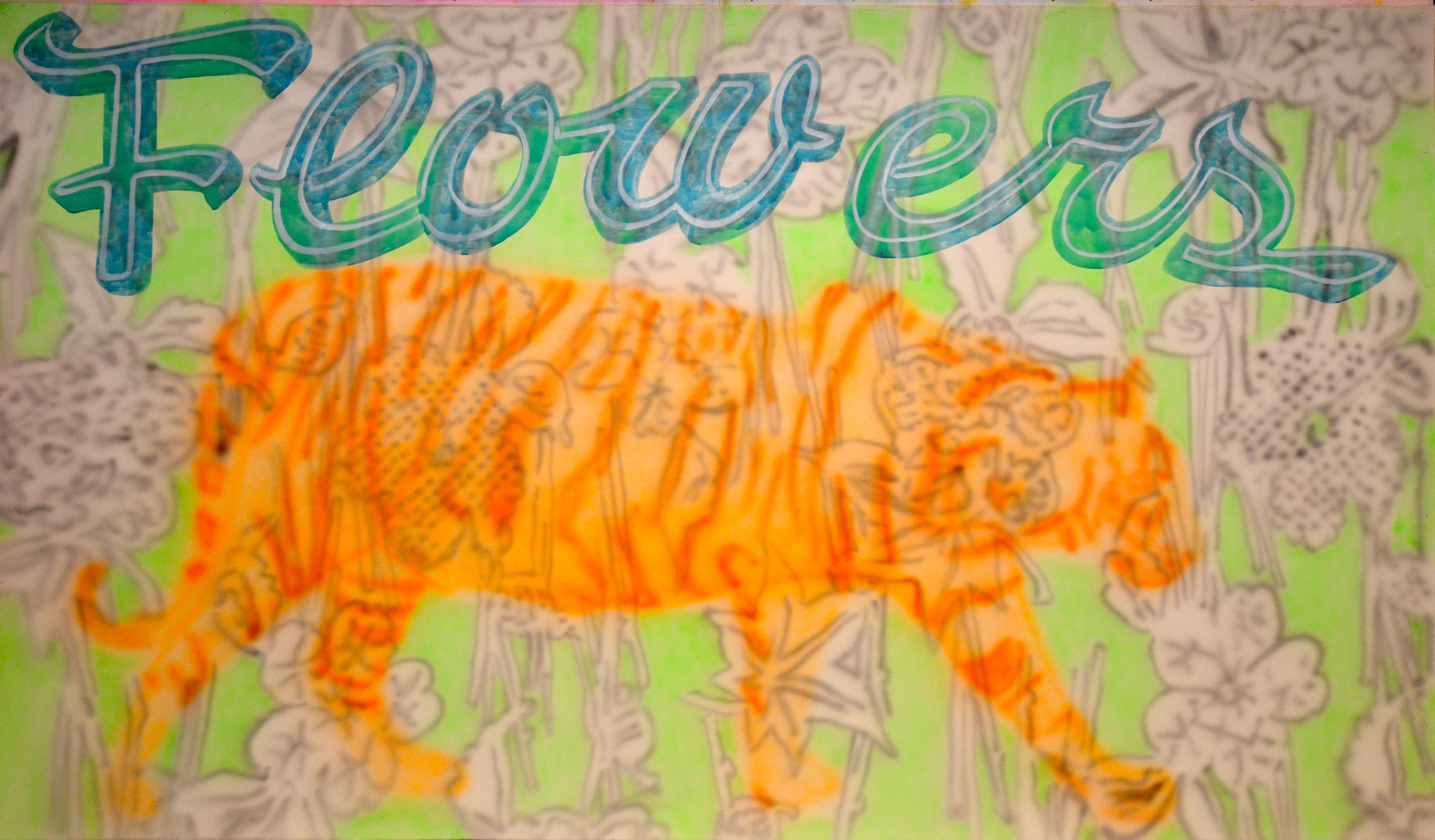
Horst Keining - Flowertiger, 210 cm x 370 cm, resin on canvas, 2011, Copyright W. Rieger and the artist

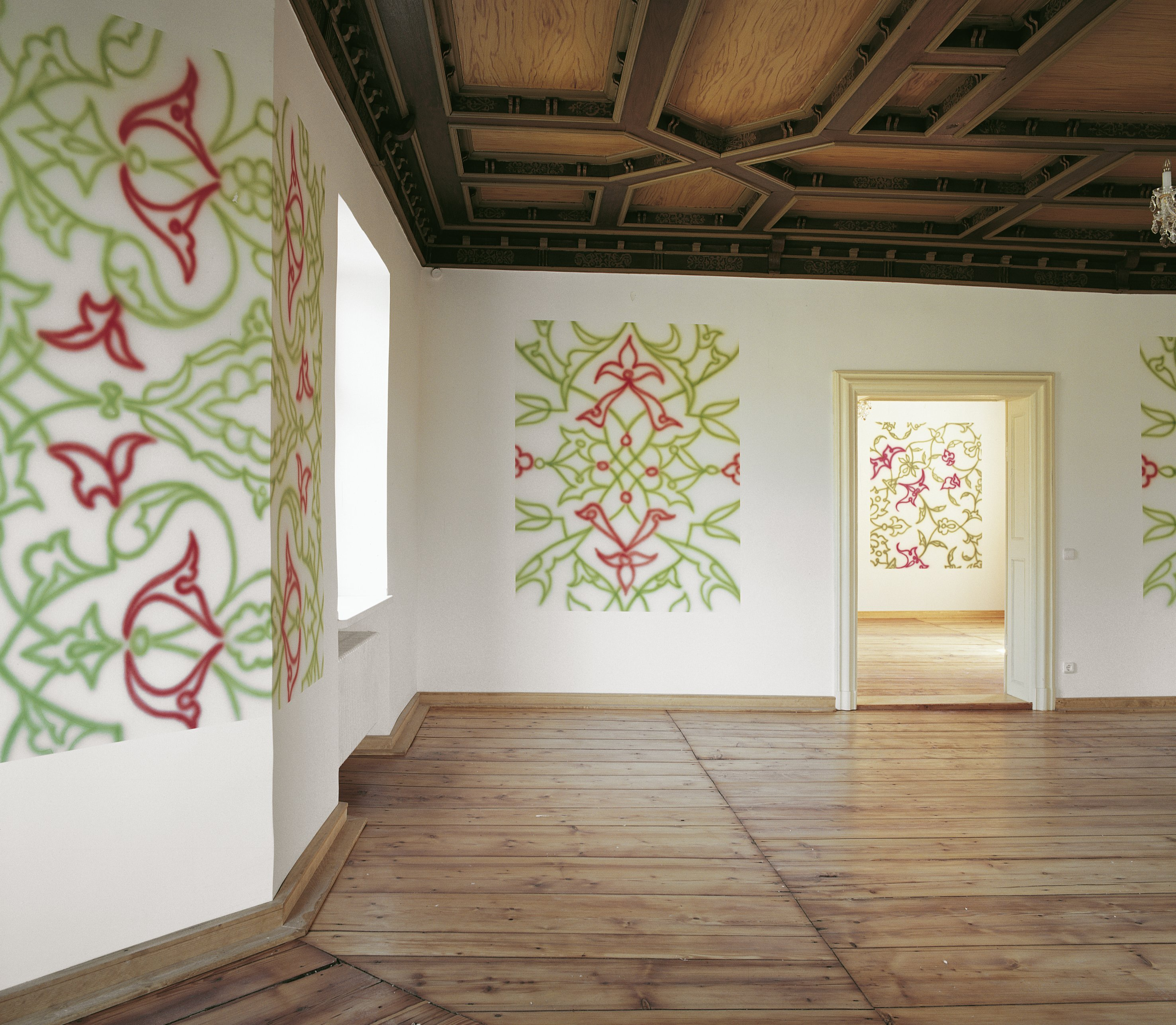
Horst Keining - Mariakirchen, 9 wallpaintings, resin, each 200 cm x 150 cm, 2003, Castle Mariakirchen at Arnsdorf, Copyright Norbert Faehling and the artist, 2013

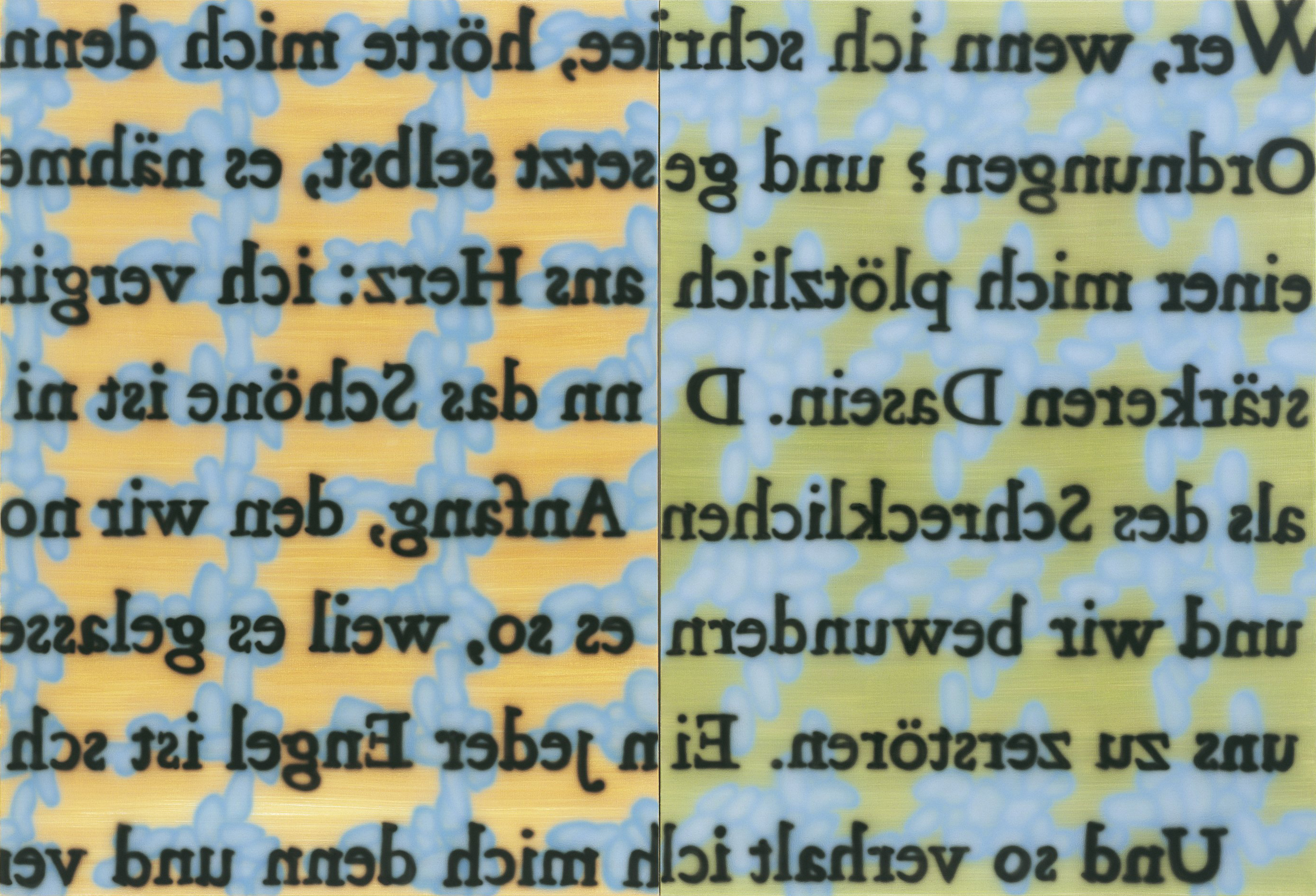
Horst Keining - Rilke, 185 cm x 270 cm, Diptych, resin on canvas, 2006, Copyright Norbert Faehling and the artist

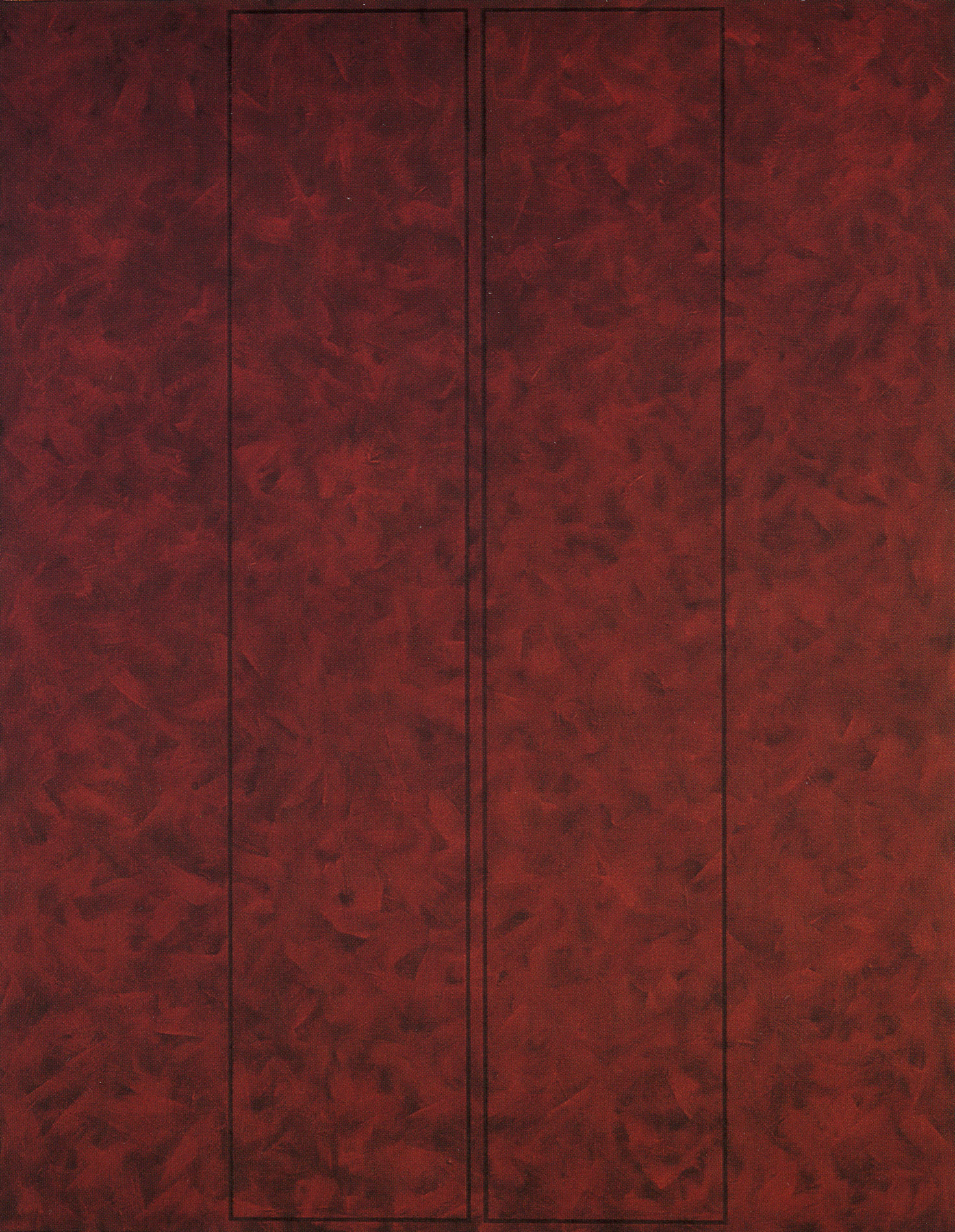
Horst Keining - Teilung auf Rot (Partition on red), 189 cm x 147 cm, oil on canvas, 1994, copyright by the artist.

During his youth, Horst Keining lived in Hattingen and Bochum, Germany. He received his high school diploma at the Goethe-Schule in Bochum in 1968. In 1970, after two semesters of studying civil engineering at the Ruhr-University Bochum, he changed to the Kunstakademie Düsseldorf.

During the first two semesters at the Kunstakademie he studied with Professor Karin Rissa and from then on with Professor Erwin Heerich. He successfully completed his study of painting in 1976. Keining continues to live and work in Düsseldorf till today.

== Career ==
Keining’s first exhibition was in 1979 in the Westfälischer Kunstverein, Münster, Germany, where he presented large watercolour paintings (about 70 cm x 90 cm) with motifs from architecture, in which the interplay of light and shadow in deserted spaces was of particular significance. In 1984 he presented watercolour paintings at exhibitions in the Kunstverein Kassel, Germany, and at the Galerie Luise Krohn in Badenweiler, Germany. These watercolour paintings using imagery from architecture are barely discernable due to being flooded by light. Then, between 1984 and 1985 the figure became the focus of Keining’s artistic interest.

In 1986, architecture again became the central theme of Keining’s painting. By this time, Keining was working at a larger studio. He created works in which the three-dimensional quality of the architecture is reduced to a flat depiction reminiscent of ground-plans, but also works that are characterized by perspective fragments of architecture. Here his preferred material was no longer watercolour, but oil-based paint, which was still applied on paper until 1990 when he began to use canvas.

On large formats (225 cm x 175 cm) the subject of ground-plans was varied in so far as line elements of the pictures define partitions of flat areas. Two extensive work groups differ from each other in colours: a blue-green and an earthy red. On the occasion of an international work-meeting Keining started to reduce the ground-plans to stripes. These pictures were part of a major exhibition together with Erwin Heerich at the Heidelberger Kunstverein (Art association of Heidelberg, Germany). Stefan Berg, director of Kunstmuseum Bonn commented: “The stripe pictures shimmer subtly between abstract flatness and three dimensionality”.

As Keining began looking for further abstract elements for pictures, script (letters) and text elements in particular played an important role. For the first time, names of brands and names of models of American car manufacturers appeared in his paintings. This was stimulated by a study visit to New York City. In 1999 Keining created a work of 90 pieces (Lukas colorplates): The relatively small paintings show all colour nuances of the well known producer of artist's paints; the producer’s specific names and numbers of the colours are integrated in the pictures thereby underscoring the use of text.

An extensive group of paintings (2002) is based on fragments of texts of Marquis de Sade. By smudging the freshly applied oil-paint Keining distorted the text to such a degree that it was almost illegible – thus giving the observers freedom to imagine their own sexual fantasies.

In 2003, Keining received a commission for paintings to be applied directly on the plaster walls of rooms in the Mariakirchen moated castle near Arnstorf, Germany. Since oil does not adhere permanently to plaster, a new technique was necessary. In order to distort the contours Keining used a spray gun and synthetic resins. He created eight wall paintings (about 200 cm x 150 cm) with a distinct ornamental structure. Due to his positive experiences with this material and technique Keining began to work with a spray gun and synthetic resin on canvas as well.

== Style ==
Until then Keining’s work had been characterized by the well-thought-out processing of specific subject areas (series, work groups). From this point on, however, he created instead individual pictures that combined in different ways elements such as flowers, animals, ornaments, but also comics and advertisements from the 1950s. Again and again script appeared as an element of the pictures. Keining used several slides projected one after another onto the canvas for the composition of the pictures. Some portions of the pictures are characterized by sprayed paint, others by brushed paint.

The overlay of the portions leads to the impression of two or more visual levels in the pictures; e.g., the sharp silhouette of painted script stands out in front of a sprayed blurred ornament in the background. As the sprayed application of paint already blurs the contours more or less, the overlay of portions of the pictures increases the blur. This approach elicits great ambiguity undermining definitive interpretations.

== Reception ==
The art historian Daniel Spanke about Keinings works: “But this diversity of possibilities of paintings, which Keining has worked for during the years, is by no means a juxtaposition of arbitrary, seemingly incompatible styles, but is based on a development that went through different styles of painting and pictures, in order to trace the essence of the picture. Thereby the interest of the observer is directed to an important fundamental question of human culture: How is the world transformed to a picture and what happens during this transformation.”

== Exhibitions (selection) ==
- 2019: ScoOP, Stadtmuseum Hattingen, Germany
- 2017: Horst Keining, IKOB International Art Centre East Belgium, Belgium
- 2016: Kaviar & Roter Tee, Martin Leyer-Pritzkow Düsseldorf
- 2016: Zugewinn, Museum Moyland Castle, Bedburg-Haus, with Katharina Sieverding a.o. (G)
- 2016: Museum = k (x+y), IKOB International Art Centre East Belgium, Eupen, (G)
- 2016: Best of Galerie König, Hanau, (G)
- 2015: BLURRED TWO, Malkasten, Düsseldorf
- 2015: ACEC - Galerie, Apeldoorn, (G)
- 2014: Blurred Pop, Museum Moyland Castle, Bedburg-Hau,(C)
- 2014: JIGGER, Galerie Ebbers, Kranenburg
- 2014: Zur Welt kommen, Galerie König, Hanau,(G)
- 2014: A Glorious Gift, Museum van Bommel van Dam, Venlo, Niederlande,(G)
- 2013: Coming Soon, Galerie König, Hanau; Am Anfang war das Wort, (G), QuadrArt Dornbirn, Österreich (G); Blurred & Bombed, Museum der Stadt Ratingen; Roman d’apprentissage d’une collection, ikob, Eupen, Belgium, (G); Paintonpaper, Galerie Ebbers, Kranenburg (G); Zufall, Kulturbahnhof Eller, Düsseldorf, (G).
- 2012: Collection Museum van Bommel van Dam, Venlo, Niederlande; IKOB-International Art Center East Belgium, Eupen, Belgium. (G)
- 2011: Kunst nach 1945, Museum der Stadt Ratingen (G); Met andere ogen, Museum van Bommel van Dam, Venlo (G), Niederlande; Galerie von Fellner, Krefeld; Galerie Ebbers, Kranenburg [G); Pamenkalnio Gallery, Vilnius, Lithuania
- 2010: Galerie Ebbers, Kranenburg; Museum van Bommel van Dam, Venlo, Niederlande; ikob-Internationales Kunstzentrum, Eupen, Belgium (c); Farbe in der zeitgenössischen Kunst, Neuer Kunstverein Gießen, (G C); Geheimnisvolle Zwischenwelten, Museum Pfalzgalerie, Kaiserslautern (G).
- 2009: Galerie König, Hanau.
- 2008: IKOB International Art Centre of East Belgium (G), Eupen, Belgium; Galerie Andreas Brüning, Düsseldorf; The IKOB-Collection, Museum van Bommel van Dam, Venlo, Niederlande; The IKOB-Collection, Museum of Young Art, Vienna, Austria, (G).
- 2007: Revision, Ludwig Museum Koblenz (C); Galerie am Hauptplatz, Fürstenfeldbruck; Vilnius Painting Trienal, Vilnius, Lithuania, (G); IKOB-International Art Centre East Belgium, (G), Eupen, Belgien.
- 2006: New Spray, Kunsthalle Wilhelmshaven (C); Panorama, Kunsthalle Gießen (C); Galerie Ebbers, Kranenburg.
- 2005: Galerie König, Hanau; DIN A 4, Galeriea Fundacion Alzh. Leon, Spain, (G); Galerie Ebbers, Kranenburg.
- 2004: Neuer Kunstverein, Aschaffenburg (C); Galerie am Hauptplatz, Fürstenfeldbruck; Stadtmuseum Siegburg (C); Flottmann-Hallen, Herne (C); Museum der Stadt Ratingen (C).
- 2002: Galerie König, Hanau (C); Museum Baden, Solingen (C); Galerie von Fellner, Krefeld; Museum Katharinenhof, Kranenburg; Kunstverein Lingen (C).
- 2001: Städtische Galerie Gladbeck (C).
- 2000: Galerie Schütte, Essen; Krefelder Kunstverein (C); Kunstverein Unna (C).
- 1999: Kunstverein Arnsberg (G); Kunstverein Lingen (C); HEERICHKEINING, Städt. Museum Mülheim an der Ruhr (C).
- 1998: HEERICHKEINING, Heidelberger Kunstverein (C); Kunstverein Bochum.
- 1997: Muzej Novejse Zgodovine, Celje, Slowenien (GC); Galerie Schütte, Essen. ^{(8)}
- 1996: Heidelberger Kunstverein (G). ^{(8)}
- 1995: Kunstverein Zagreb, Kroatien (G).
- 1993: Museum Katharinenhof, Kranenburg (C). ^{(9)}
- 1989: Nijmegs Museum, Nijmegen, Niederlande (G).
- 1986: Kunstverein Soest.
- 1984: Galerie Luise Krohn, Badenweiler; Kasseler Kunstverein (G).
- 1983: Museum Katharinenhof, Kranenburg.
- 1982: Städtische Galerie Düsseldorf, Düsseldorf.
- 1981: Galerie Appel & Fertsch, Frankfurt (G).
- 1980: Oberhessisches Museum, Gießen ^{[10)}
- 1979: Westfälischer Kunstverein Münster, (G).

C=Catalogue; G=Group exhibitions

== Works in public collections ==
- Ludwig Museum, Koblenz, Germany
- Pfalzgalerie, Kaiserslautern, Germany
- Museum van Bommel van Dam, Venlo, Netherlands
- IKOB International Art Centre East Belgium, Eupen, Belgium
- Kunsthalle Wilhelmshaven; Germany
- Kunst aus NRW, Reichsabtei Aachen Kornelimünster, Germany
- Sammlung Museum Moyland Castle, Collection Van der Grinten (Joseph Beuys)
- Stadtmuseum Ratingen, Germany
- Commanderie van St.Jan, Nijmegen, Netherlands
