= Kuras =

Kuras or Kuraś is a surname. Notable people with the surname include:

- Benjamin Kuras (born 1944), Anglo–Czech writer
- Ellen Kuras (born 1959), American cinematographer
- Józef Kuraś (1915–1947), Polish Army officer
- Magdalena Kuras (born 1988), Swedish swimmer
- Mariusz Kuras (born 1965), Polish footballer
- Ed Kuras (born 1963), American Entrepreneur
