= Wild Dreams of New Beginnings =

Studio album by Admiral Freebee
- Released: 10 October 2006
- Recorded: July 2006
- Studio: Le Maison Blue Studios, Kingston, NY; Masterlink, Nashville, Tennessee
- Genre: Rock
- Length: 37:22
- Label: Universal Music Belgium
- Producer: Malcolm Burn

Admiral Freebee chronology
Songs (2005)	Wild Dreams of New Beginnings (2006)	The Honey and The Knife (2010)

Wild Dreams of New Beginnings is the third album by the Belgian rock band Admiral Freebee. It was released on 10 October 2006 by Universal Music Belgium.

The album was produced by Malcolm Burn and includes a duet with Emmylou Harris ("Coming of the Knight").

== Track listing ==
1. "Faithful to the Night" – 3:06
2. "I'd Much Rather Go Out with the Boys" – 3:14
3. "Trying To Get Away" – 3:46
4. "All Through the Night" – 2:42
5. "Perfect Town" – 4:52
6. "Nobody Knows You" – 3:56
7. "Wild Dreams of New Beginnings" – 3:23
8. "Devil in the Details" – 3:16
9. "Living for the Weekend" – 2:58
10. "Blue Eyes" – 2:25
11. "Coming of the Knight" – 3:44

== Charts ==
=== Weekly charts ===
Chart (2006)	Peak position
Belgian Albums (Ultratop Flanders)	1
Belgian Albums (Ultratop Wallonia)	41

=== Year-end charts ===
Chart (2006)	Position
Belgian Albums (Ultratop Flanders)	32
Chart (2007)	Position
Belgian Albums (Ultratop Flanders)	88
