= Benjamin Kuras =

Anglo-Czech writer

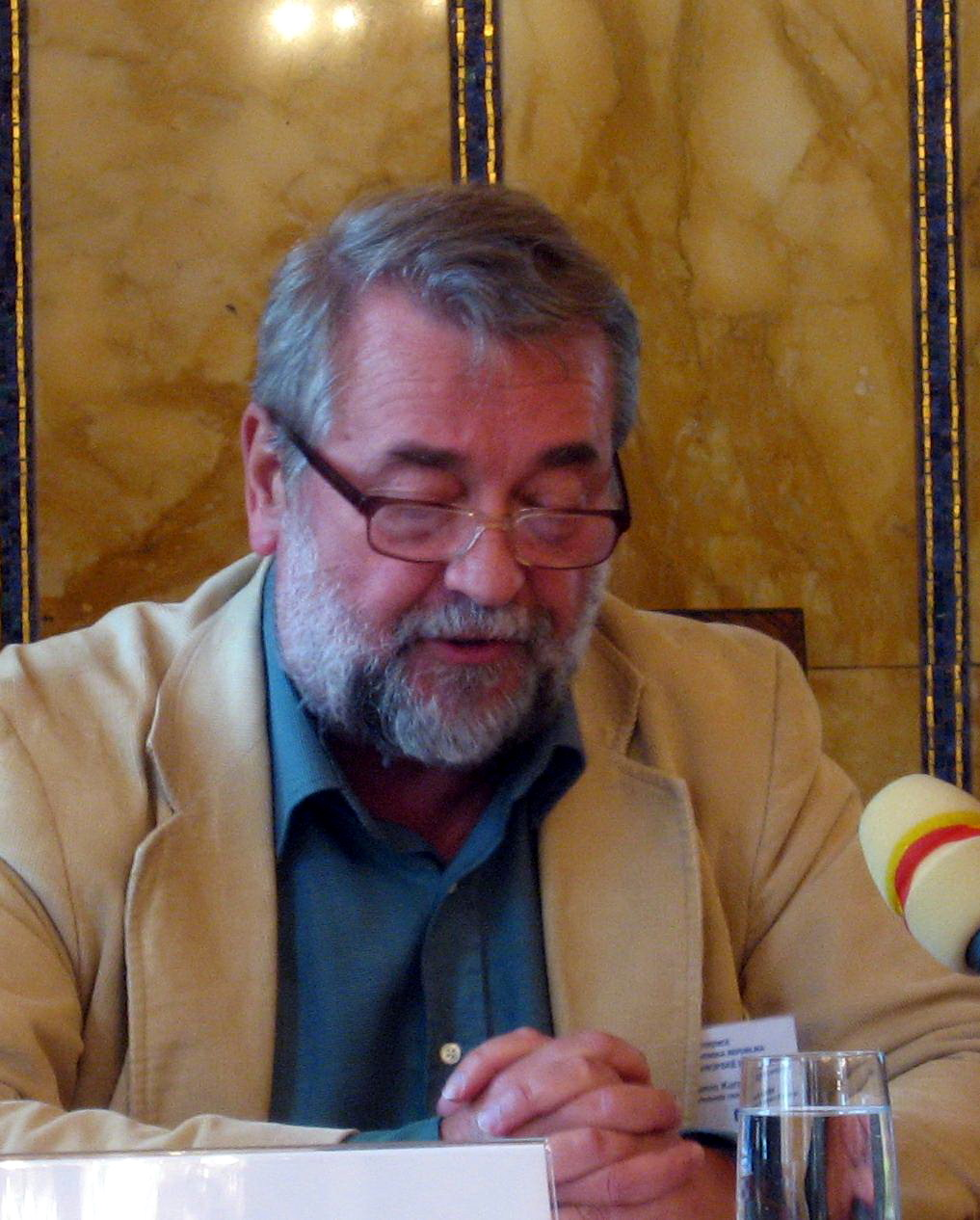
- Benjamin Kuras in 2007
- Born: Miloslav Kuraš; 4 April 1944 (age 82); Zlín
- Occupation: Writer
- Writing career
- Language: Czech, English
- Notable works: Supper of Ashes, Friday Murder, Czechs and Balances, As Golems Go

Benjamin Kuras (born April, 4, 1944) is an Anglo-Czech writer dubbed “a humorist who is taken seriously” by The Prague Post and “Pope of Czech literature” by the Czech daily Dnes. His non-fiction writing covers a broad variety of subjects from history, politics and religion to sex and food. His preferred dramatic genre is tragi-comedy.

Czech expatriate in London since 1968 (UK citizen since 1974), he worked for a decade as broadcaster with the BBC World Service and had his first English play performed on BBC Radio 4 in 1976. This was followed by further 15 plays, mostly detective comedies, performed on radio and in small theatres in the UK, Germany, Switzerland, Austria, Israel and the Czech Republic.

His major success was Supper of Ashes, a tragi-comedy about the last days of the Italian Renaissance heretic philosopher Giordano Bruno. After a rehearsed reading at the Soho Poly in London, the play was taken up by BBC Radio and had a 16-month run in German translation in the repertory of Eurotheater in Bonn where it was produced with the assistance of the Italian Institute of Culture and the University of Bonn. On the Czech stage, his play Friday Murder remained in the repertory of a small Prague theatre from 2013 for 6 years and was voted best of the year at a festival of small-cast plays. His Never Done played for 5 years in his birthplace Zlín and had a TV production.

In 1990, he started making return visits to the Czech Republic. and took up writing again in Czech, with articles for several newspapers and magazines which by 2022 total over 3000. He is a regular contributor to the Czech mutation of Playboy. He has published over 30 books in Czech and 4 in English. His latest Czech books, as well as a large number of articles, explore the suicide of Western civilisation and the perils it is currently facing. His latest produced play Self–Deceptions, written first in Czech, a comedy on the quirks of Simone de Beauvoir and Jean-Paul Sartre (with a bit of help from Che Guevara), had its premier on Czech Radio in 2013. Kuras' translations for the Czech stage include Jeff Baron´s Visiting Mr. Green and John Misto´s Madame Rubinstein

== Plays ==
List of plays and selected reviews:

- Anthony and Francis Are Alive (1976)
- Friday Murder (1977)
- Dead Bishop (1978)
- Ice–Makers (1979)
- An Encounter of the Fourth Kind (1980)
- The Last Broadcast (1982)
- Blasting In Progress (1983)
- The Andromedan Way (1983)
- Milk And Honey (1984)
- Russian Salad (1985)
- Never Done (1986)
- Supper of Ashes (1988)
- Mwrnckx – A Diary of an AIDS Virus (1988)
- Goldberg, New York (1988)
- The Golden City (1997)
- Inspector Goldgerg Returns (2003)
- The Spa That Never Dies (2009)
- Self–Deceptions (2012)
- Keeping Your Woman In Bliss (2012)
- And Free Viagra (completed 2013)

Anthony and Francis Are Alive

- “Full of relish, sinewy, witty and rich. Certainly the best radio of the week.” (Philip Glassborow, The Listener)
- “A comedy eschewing the extremes of heroism and cowardice and displaying cynicism with a human face. That Mr Kuras´ sharp-tongued, unprincipled dissenters might, like the Good Soldier Schweik before them, be an outpost of common decency and reason might outrage them, thereby providing more entertainment for evesdroppers.” (Peter Vansittart, The Times)

Friday Murder

- “Deft lunchtime two-hander … which amply demonstrates how the events of the past can live interminably to haunt history survivors.” (Michael Coveney, The Financial Times)
- “The unravelling of the situation … builds through humour and well-observed characterisation a rare intellectual excitement.” (Ned Chaillet, The Times)

== Books ==
Selected books (in English) and reviews:

- Czechs and Balances (1996) ISBN 978-80-85890-58-7.
- As Golems Go (1999)
- Is There Life On Marx? (2000)
- Restoring Comenius (2007)

Czechs and Balances

- "Makes Czech history look as easy as getting thrown out of a window. Dissects the Czech national character with relish and wit […] an informative, highly entertaining perspective on Czech history – a rarity in English." (David Speranza in The Prague Post)

As Golems Go

- "A fine study of the thoughts and writings of the Maharal, presented in a humorous and popular format." (Jonathan Magonet in European Judaism)

Is There Life On Marx?

- "A series of short reflections on developments and problems in Czech society after 1989. One is bound to crack a smile sooner or later, the satirical portraits of contemporary politicians are particularly refreshing." (Kathleen Hayes in The Prague Post)
