= Tim Van Laere Gallery =

- Established: 1997
- Location: Belgium
- Coordinates: 51.20551°N 4.38186°E
- Type: Art gallery, contemporary art
- Founder: Tim Van Laere
- Website: www.timvanlaeregallery.com

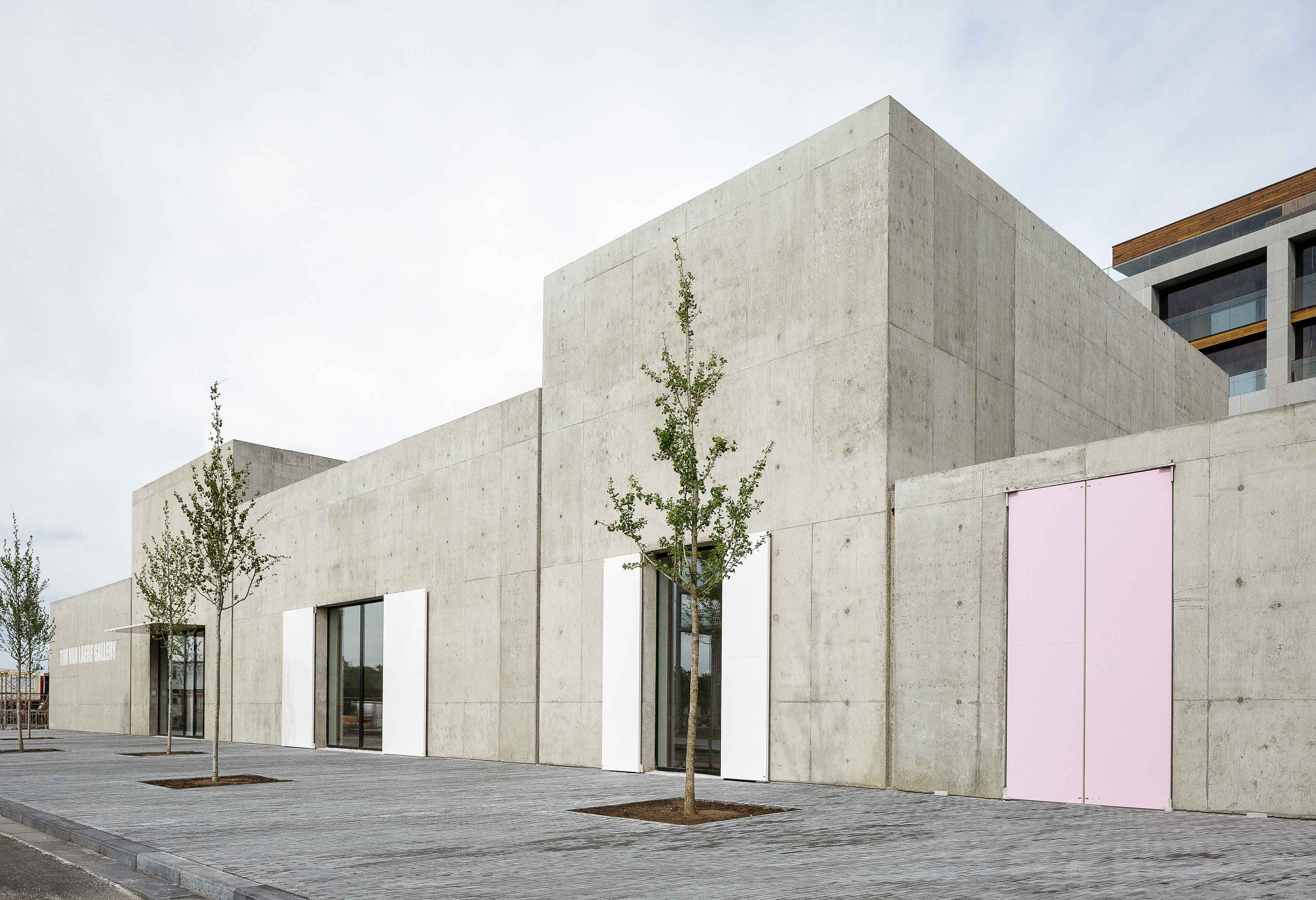

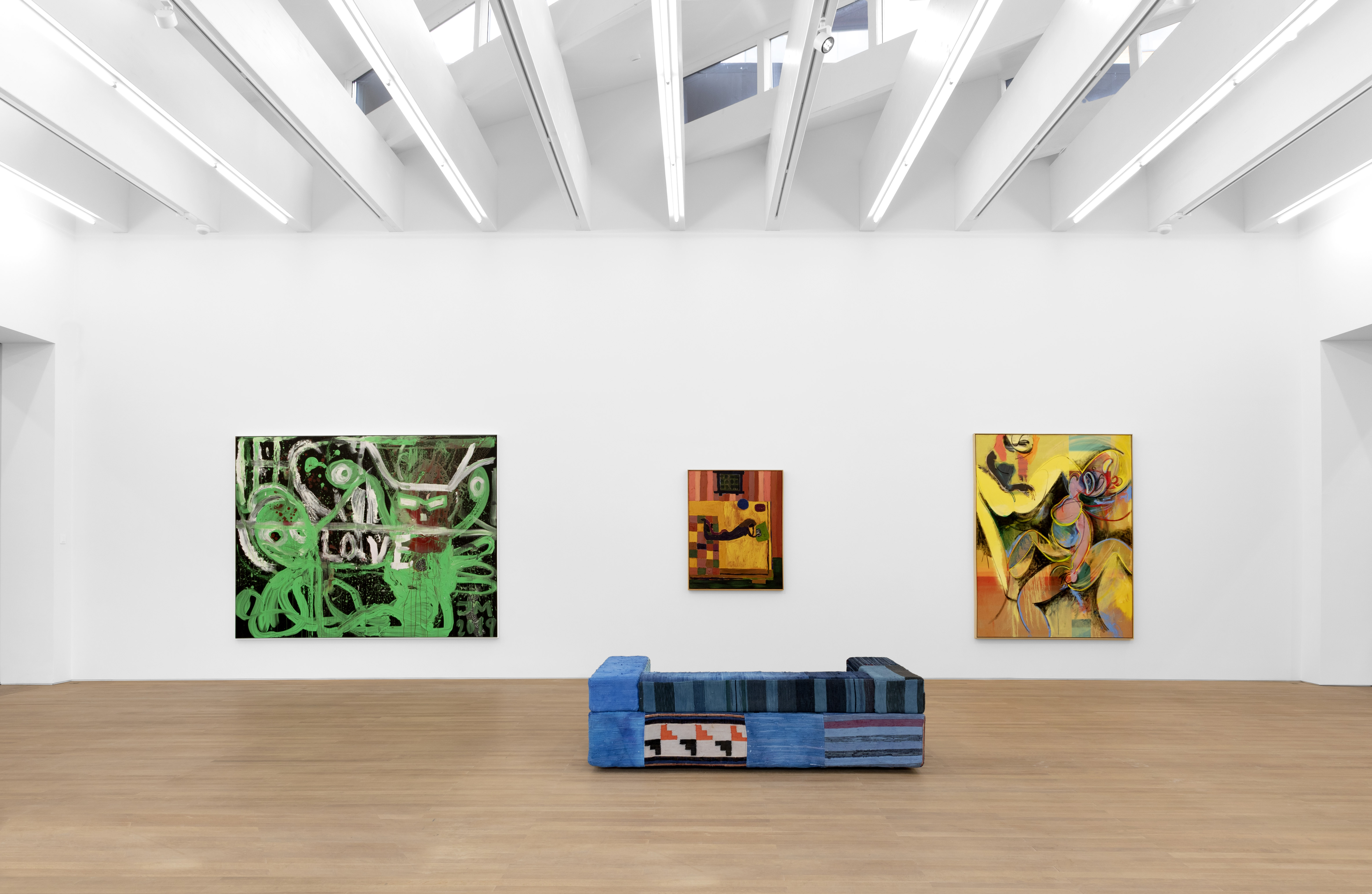

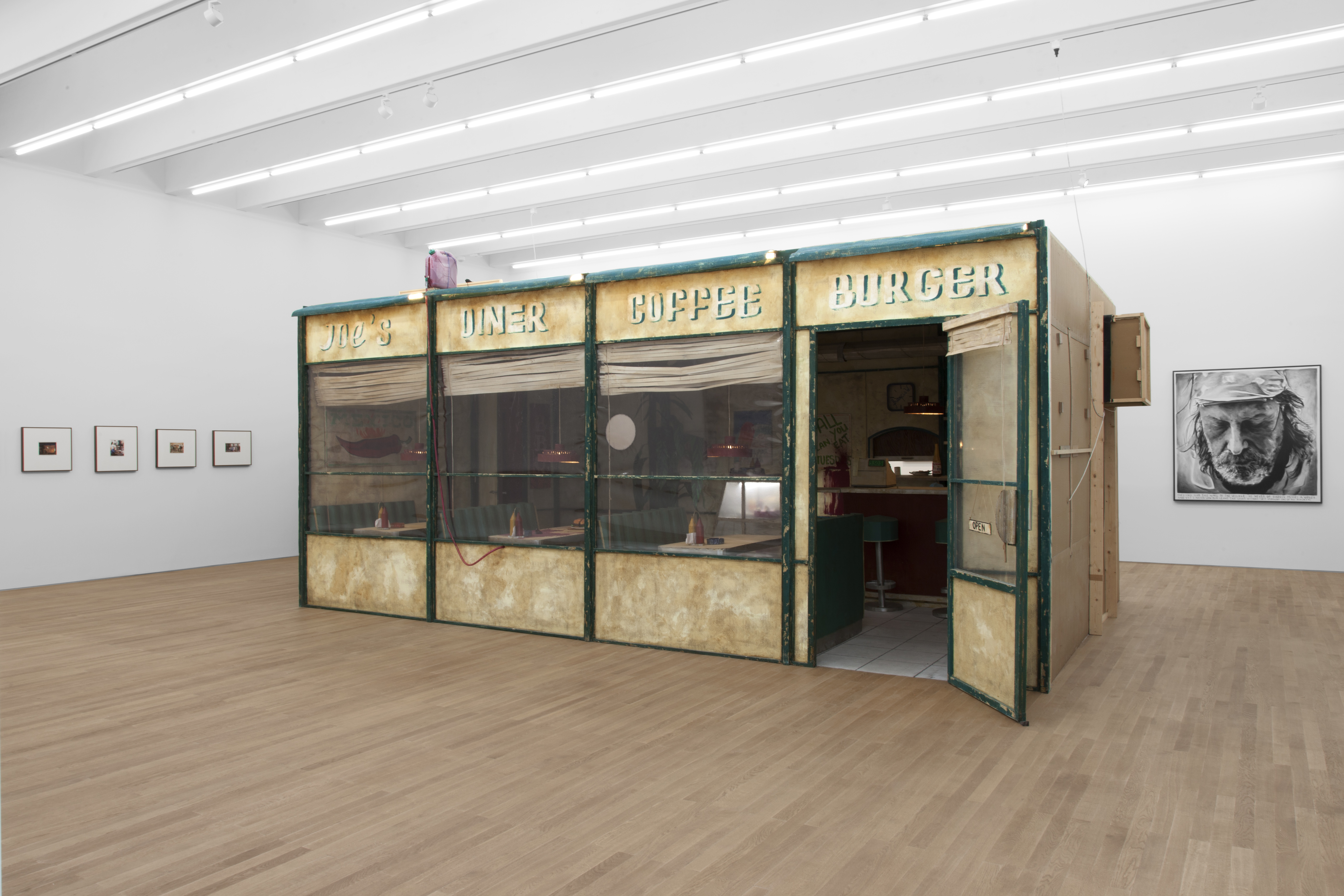

Tim Van Laere Gallery is a contemporary art gallery with locations in Antwerp and Rome, founded in 1997 by Tim Van Laere. The gallery focuses both on the work of young, emerging artists and established international artists.

Ever since the gallery was founded, it has acquired a reputation on the global art scene, with artists from many different countries exhibiting works of all media (sculpture, painting, video, installation, photography). In the past couple of years, important names such as Kati Heck, Jonathan Meese, Anton Henning, Adrian Ghenie and Rinus Van de Velde have all had solo shows at the gallery.

In fall 2023 Tim Van Laere Gallery opened its second location in Rome. The space is located in the 17th century Palazzo Donarelli Ricci, which incorporates some terraced houses of the 15th century. The architect-owner was Giacomo della Porta. The palazzo is located on the historical Via Giulia, a roughly half-mile-long cobbled street that is lined nearly end to end with churches and elegant palazzi, starting with the ivy-covered Farnese arch, designed by Michelangelo and erected in 1603.

The gallery is showing 10 exhibitions per year and participates in a number of International Art Fairs.

== Artists ==
- Bram Demunter
- Marcel Dzama
- Armen Eloyan
- Gelitin
- Adrian Ghenie
- Kati Heck
- Anton Henning
- Leiko Ikemura
- Friedrich Kunath
- Edward Lipski
- Jonathan Meese
- Ryan Mosley
- Muller Van Severen
- Jockum Nordström
- Tal R
- Peter Rogiers
- Ben Sledsens
- Ed Templeton
- Dennis Tyfus
- Inès van den Kieboom
- Rinus Van de Velde
- Franz West
