= Euro Theater Central Bonn =

Coordinates: 50°44′06″N 7°05′59″E

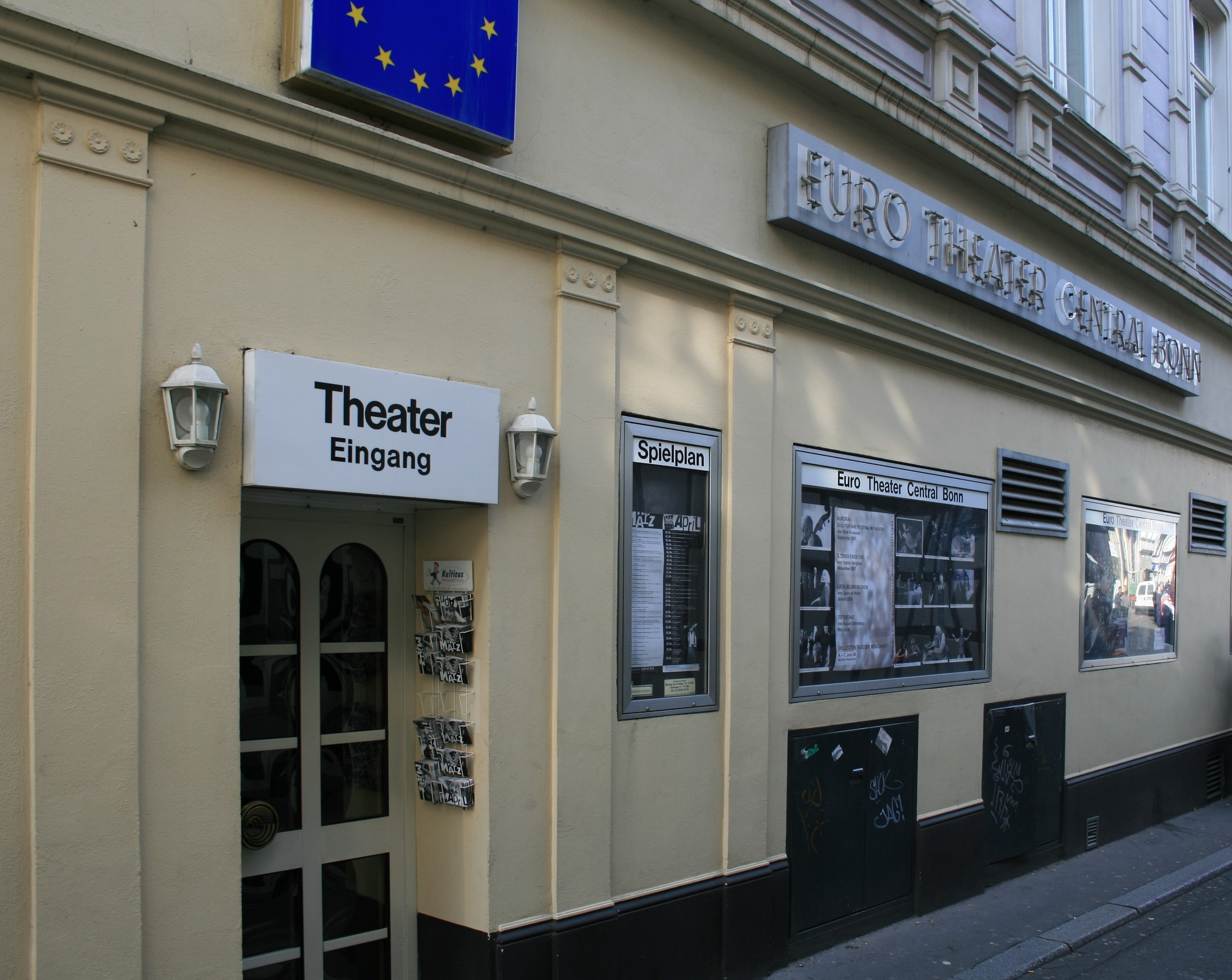

Euro Theater Central Bonn is a theatre in Bonn, North Rhine-Westphalia, Germany.
