= Museum of Young Art =

Museum in Vienna, Austria

Coordinates: 48.211983°N 16.366425°E

The Museum Of Young Art (MOYA) founded 2005 in Vienna, Austria, was the first museum worldwide exclusively devoted to 21st-century young art. The MOYA was a privately owned museum, founded and operated by Swiss-German art historian and manager Dr. Kolja Kramer, showcasing artworks created exclusively after the year 2000, with a particular focus on early works by emerging artists. The stylistic focus of its exhibitions was on contemporary painting, video installations, photography and Fantastic Realism. The museum provided opportunities for young artists to showcase their skills in a formal setting. However, in 2015 the MOYA-Museum of Young Art in Vienna was closed permanently.

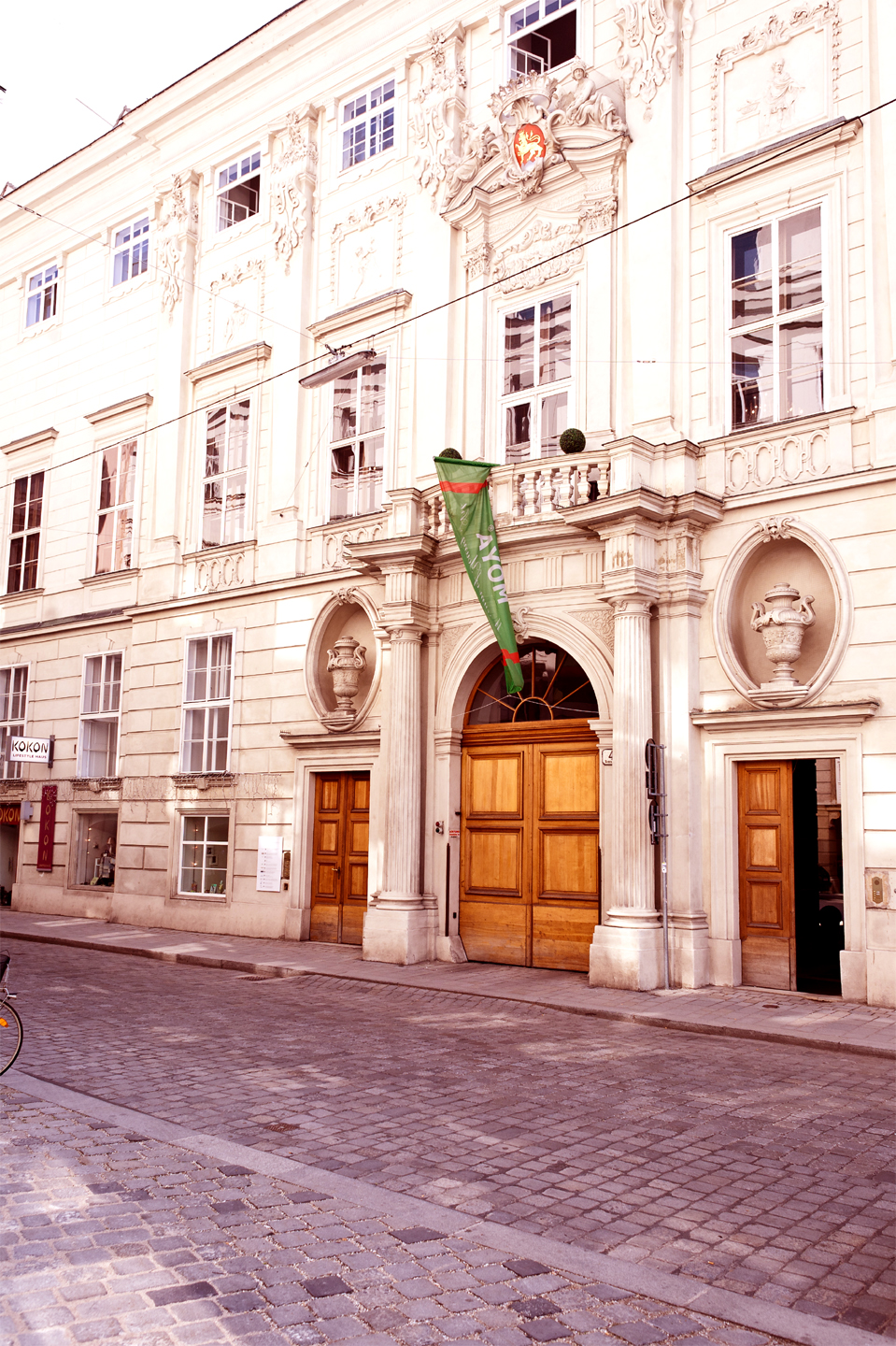

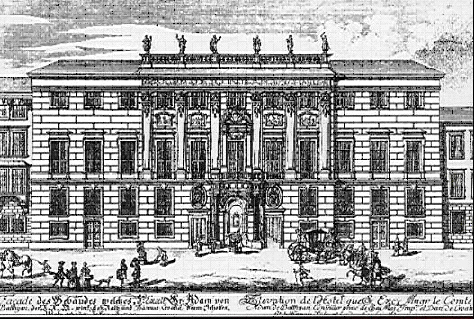

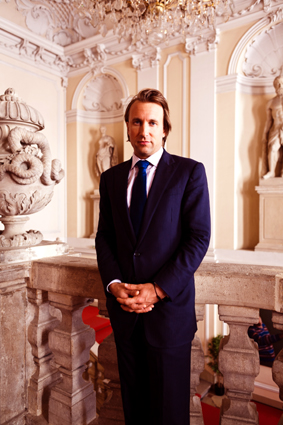

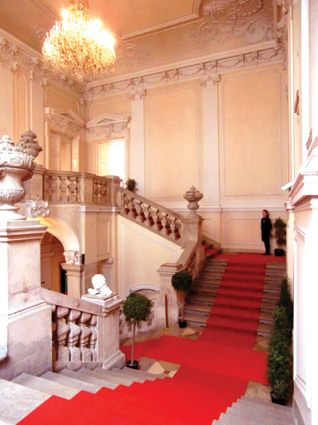

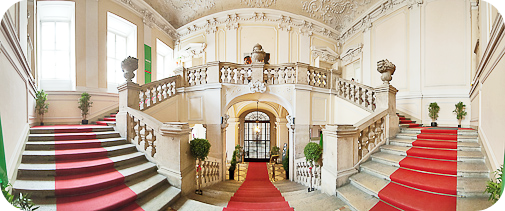

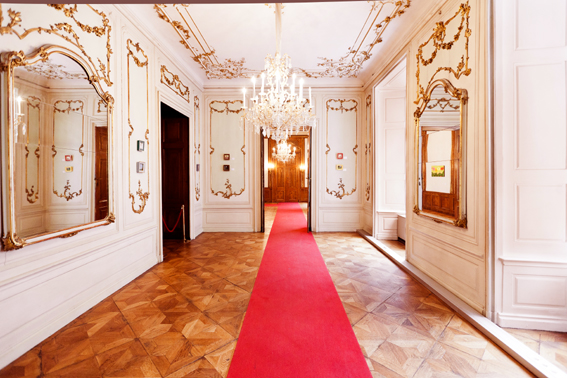

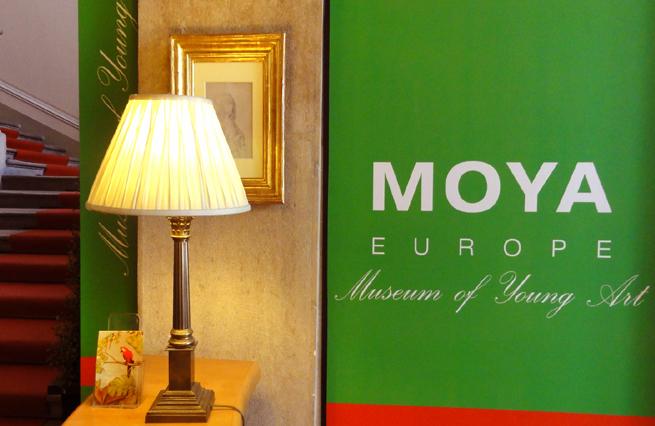

== Location and ownership ==
The first location of the MOYA was at Vienna Ring Road, next to Vienna's Burgtheater and the Rathaus, Vienna, in Löwelstrasse. In 2010 it moved to a larger city palace nearby, to Palais Schönborn-Batthyány at the Freyung, built by the baroque architect Johann Bernhard Fischer von Erlach, in the center of Vienna in Renngasse. The gallery was owned and managed by Dr. Kolja Kramer, a fine artist specializing in contemporary and emerging art.

== Representation ==
In the MOYA, mainly contemporary young European art was presented even though there was a concentration on regional art from Vienna and Austria and its neighboring countries. Artists did not need to be already established upon entry into exhibitions. The annual show `Young Art Global´ regularly put the regional context in a broader spatial temporal perspective with international artists from various countries around the world. In 2014 the MOYA received the Flame of Peace, an award given by members of the Habsburg family for contributions to world peace.

The style of the gallery's collections represented exclusively contemporary works, including painting, photography and video. Most frequently exhibited artworks were from Belgium, Romania and Austria, also exhibiting the works of French, Russian, Chinese, Australian, Italian and Middle Eastern artists. Artists whose works have featured in the museum have included those from Andorra, Austria, Azerbaijan, Belgium, Brazil, China, Colombia, Costa Rica, Croatia, Cyprus, Czech Republic, Estonia, Germany, Greece, Guatemala, Hungary, India, Ireland, Italy, Japan, Latvia, Malaysia, Malta, Netherlands, Norway, Panama, Philippines, Poland, Portugal, Romania, Saudi Arabia, Slovakia, Slovenia, Sweden, Switzerland, Turkey and Ukraine.

== Artists ==
Its most frequently exhibited artists included Naomi Devil, specializing in drawing and Appropriation (art), Willi Filz, contemporary photographer, and Leopold Plomteux, digital artist. Other artists include Erik Sille, Surrealist graphic landscape painter and designer, and Karolina Pernar, Installation artist. Sorin Tara, Marissa Calbet, Elena Churnosova, Valetintini Ferdinando, Sibilla Bjarnasson have also featured in the exhibitions.
