= Kati Heck =

German artist (born 1979)

- Born: 1979 (age 46–47); Düsseldorf, North Rhine-Westphalia, Germany
- Occupation: Artist

Kati Heck (born 1979, Düsseldorf, Germany) is a German artist based in Antwerp. Though her work spans sculptural installation, short film, and photography, she is best known for her large-scale paintings.

Heck has shown work internationally in many exhibitions including Art Brussels at Galerie Annie Gentils, Bonds of Love at John Connelly Presents in New York and 59 STE Badischer Kunstpreis at Museum Baden. She is represented by John Connelly Presents in New York, Tim Van Laere Gallery in Antwerp and Marc Selwyn Fine Art in Los Angeles.

== Early life ==
At age 19 Heck came to Antwerp, Belgium to study fashion, but chose painting instead. Her classical training in painting can be seen in her work, which is often very figurative.

== Solo exhibitions ==
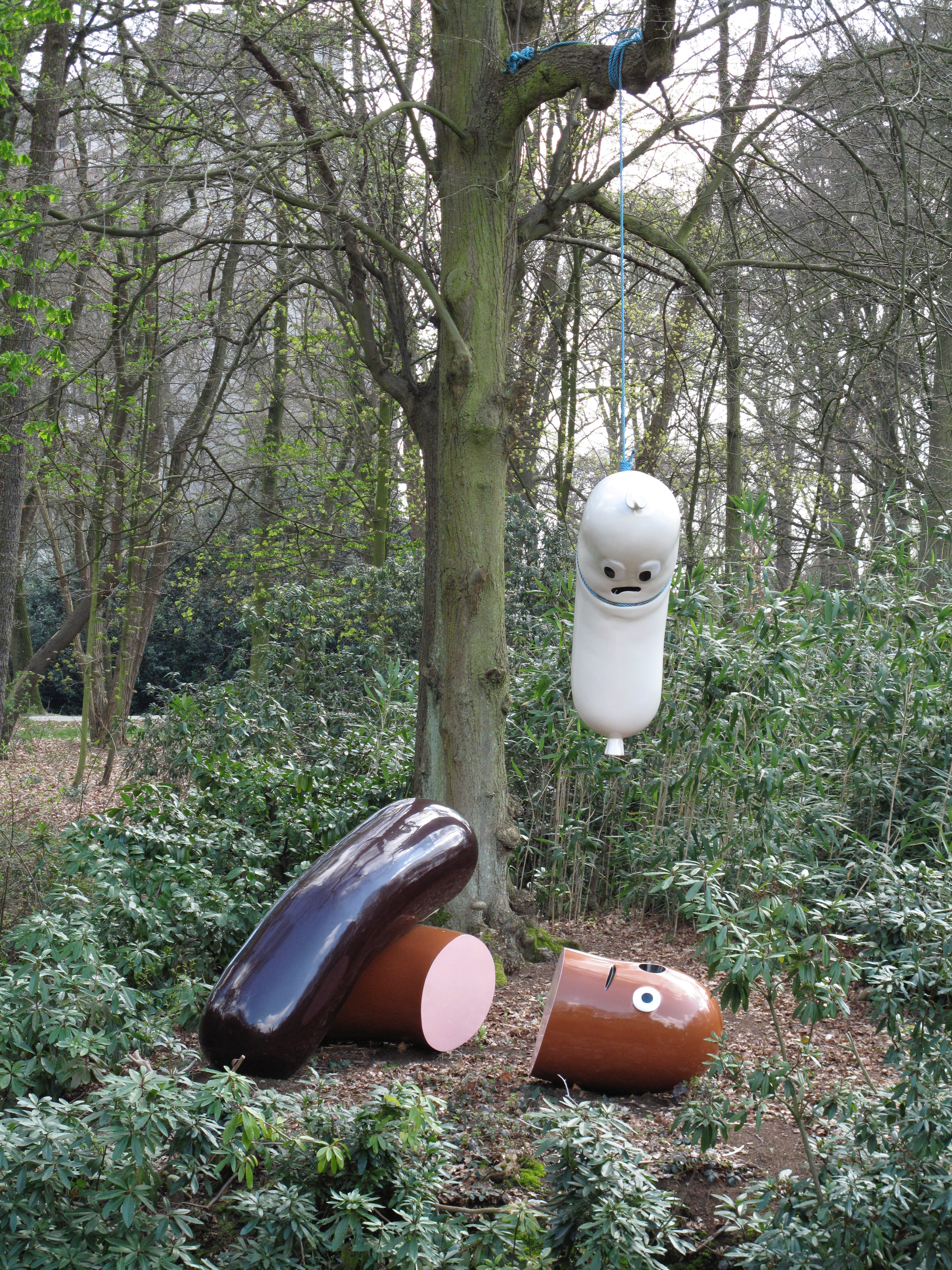
Dabei Sein Ist Alles, 2006

- 2017: Kati Heck, Sadie Coles HQ, London, UK
- 2016: Meister Stuten Stellvertreter, Tim Van Laere Gallery, Antwerp, BE; Holy Hauruck, M HKA, Antwerp, BE
- 2015: Ins Büro!, Corbett vs. Dempsey, Chicago, US
- 2014: Mann o Mann, Tim Van Laere Gallery, Antwerp, BE
- 2013: KOPF = KOPFNUSS, CAC Malaga, Malaga, ES
- 2011: Multikulti Sause, Tim Van Laere Gallery, Antwerp, BE
- 2010: Bremsspuren, Galerie Mario Mauroner, Vienna, AT; Solanum Tuberosum. Tauben sprechen kein Deutsch, Atelierschiff der Stadt Frankfurt, DE
- 2009: The Nono und die Fratzenpleite, Marc Selwyn Fine Art, Los Angeles, US; Vier Leute passen in ein Taxi, Stella Lohaus Gallery, Antwerp, BE
- 2008: Gsuffa, der eiserne Pomoment, Mary Boone Gallery, NYC, US; Bonzenspeck und Prollgehabe, Museum Het Domein, Sittard, NL
- 2007: Heisse Bräute und Geile Würste, Galerie Annie Gentils, Antwerp, BE
- 2006: W139, Amsterdam, NL; Prost Mahlzeit, Marc Selwyn Fine Art, Los Angeles, US
- 2005: Die Grosse Egale, Galerie Annie Gentils, Antwerp, BE

== Group exhibitions ==
- 2017:
  - #infiniteflowersplusone, Plus-one Gallery, Antwerp, BE
- 2016:
  - Tomorrow is a long time, Tim Van Laere Gallery, Antwerp, BE
  - Zot Geweld/ Dwaze Maagd, Hof van Busleyden, Mechelen, BE
- 2015:
  - We will begin by drawing, we shall continue to draw and then we shall draw some more, Tim Van Laere Gallery, Antwerp, BE
  - Blickachsen, Bad Hamburg, Hamburg, DE
  - 50 years Middelheim Promotors, Middelheim museum, Antwerp, BE
  - De Zeven Hoofdzonden, Ronny Van de Velde, Knokke, BE
  - Run for the Roses, Tim Van Laere Gallery, Antwerp, BE
- 2014:
  - Portray, Tim Van Laere Gallery, Antwerp, BE The Agency, London, UK
- 2013: Middle Gate, Geel, BE
  - Happy Birthday Dear Academie, MAS, Antwerp, BE
  - Het karakter van een collectie, M HKA, Antwerp, BE
  - CADAVRE EXQUIS. A FIGURE OF PAINTING, LLS 387, Antwerp, BE
- 2012: Kamarama, Bruges, BE
  - Ni Mas ni menos, Galeria Mecanica, Sevilla, ES
  - VACANZA PERMANENTE, NICC, Antwerp, BE
  - Painters' Painters, Saatchi Gallery, London, UK
  - Campaign, C24 Gallery, New York, US
- 2011: In the company of humour, Lokaal 01, Breda, NL
  - Herr Seagull and His Global Dustbreath, The Parachute Project, Wisconsin, US
  - A Paper Trail, De Halle, Geel, BEKunstpreis Ikob, Ikob, Eupen, BE
  - FREESTATE II, Oosteroever, Ostend, BEAccrochage, Stella Lohaus Gallery, Antwerp, BE
- 2010:
  - When will they finally see the power of drawing, Geukens & De Vil, Antwerp, BE
  - Powerhaus, Power Galerie, Hamburg, DE
  - Pop Art, Scheld’apen in NICC, Antwerp, BE
  - For your eyes only, De Markten, Brussels, BE
  - Works on paper, Stella Lohaus Gallery, Antwerp, BE
  - Changez! Een Belgenshow, 21Rozendaal, Enschede, NL
  - The State of Things- Contemporary art from China and Belgium (curated by Ai Weiwei en Luc Tuymans), National Art Museum of China, Beijing, CN
- 2009:
  - The State of Things (curated by Ai Weiwei en Luc Tuymans), Paleis voor Schone kunsten (Bozar), Brussels, BE
- 2008:
  - A Meeting between the tragic and the funny, Brakke Grond, Amsterdam, NL
  - A Meeting between the tragic and the funny, Hessenhuis, Antwerp, BE
  - Honorons Honoré, De Garage, ruimte voor actuele kunst, Mechelen, BE
  - UN-SCR-1325, Geukens en De Vil, Antwerp, BE
- 2007:
  - Pushing the Canvas, Cultuurcentrum Mechelen, Mechelen, BE
  - Status Questionis, Annie Gentils Gallery, Antwerp, BE
  - Feste, Annie Gentils Gallery, Antwerp, BESmall Stuff three, Beersel, BE
  - Welcome home, M HKA, Antwerp, BE
- 2006:
  - The Agency, London, UK
  - Beaufort Triennale Oostende, PMMK Ostend/ Bredene, Ostend, BE
  - View ten, Mary Boone Gallery, New York, US
- 2005:
  - Bonds of Love, John Connelly Presents, New York US
  - 59. Badischer Kunstpreis, Museum Baden, Solingen, DE
- 2004:
  - Coming People, Leere X Visionen, Herford, DE
  - Nicole Klagsbrun Gallery, New York, US
  - Probeweise Gewalt auf Vorrat, Annie Gentils Gallery, Antwerp, BE
  - Freundschaftsmaschine, Annie Gentils Gallery, Antwerp, BE
- 2003:
  - Sugar and Spice, Annie Gentils Gallery, Antwerp, BE
  - Camille-Huysmansprijs, Kunstencentrum Elzenveld, Antwerp, BE
  - Ithaka, Kunstencentrum Het Stuk, Leuven, BE
