= George Mosson =

German painter

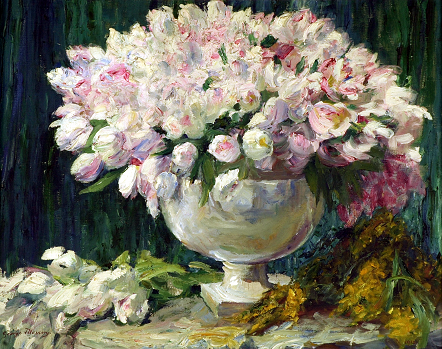
Tulipes in a vase, 1912.

George Mosson (2 February 1851 – 3 September 1933) was a Franco-German painter and draftsman, founding member of the artists' association Berliner Secession. He was mainly known for his paintings of still lives representing flowers, but he also painted landscapes and portraits.

== Career ==
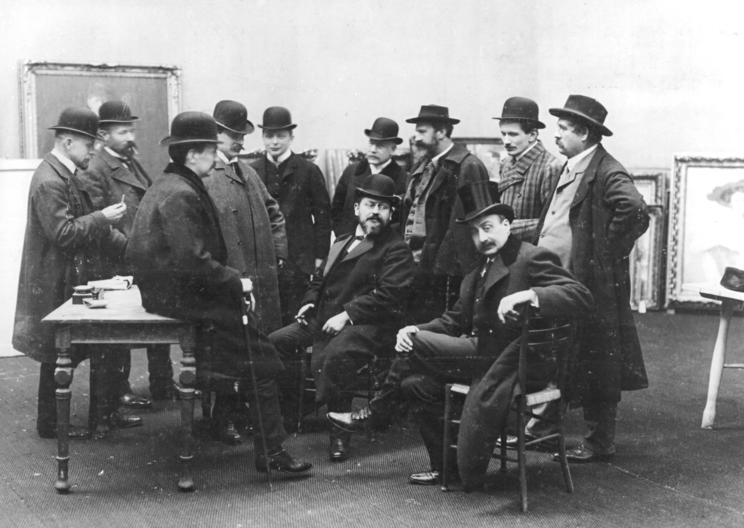
Jury for the Berlin Secession 1908 exhibition. From the left: sculptors Fritz Klimsch and August Gaul, painters Walter Leistikow and Hans Baluschek, art dealer Paul Cassirer, painters Max Slevogt (sitting) and George Mosson (standing), sculptor Max Kruse, painters Max Liebermann (sitting), Emil Rudolf Weiss and Lovis Corinth.

Mosson was born in 1851 in Aix-en-Provence, in the south of France. He emigrated to Berlin at the age of 14, where he finished his schooling. His artistic training began with studies at the Academy of Arts, Berlin, with professors Carl Steffeck and Hermann Freese. He continued his studies at the Weimar Saxon Grand Ducal Art School, and began to exhibit his works in Berlin in 1884.

In 1892, Mosson was co-founder of the Vereinigung der XI collective as well as founding member of the Berliner Secession association, grouped together to protest against the conservatism of the "Association of Berlin Artists". After the split of this group in 1913, Mosson joined forces with Max Liebermann, Max Slevogt and others to form the Free Secession. He was also a member of the Union of German Artists ("Deutschen Künstlerbundes").

Mosson died on September 3, 1933, in Berlin.

== Paintings ==
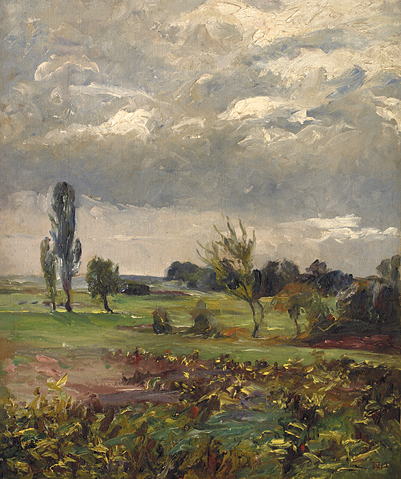
Märkische Landschaft, 1915

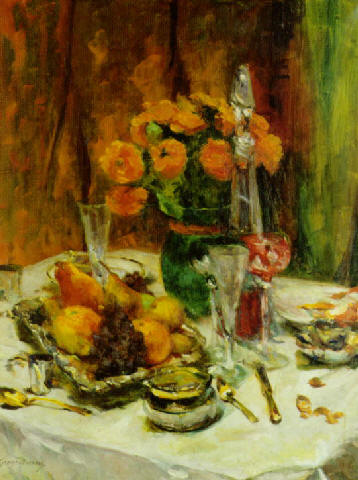
Intérieur avec table couverte et verres de champagne, fruits et asters de Chine, 1919

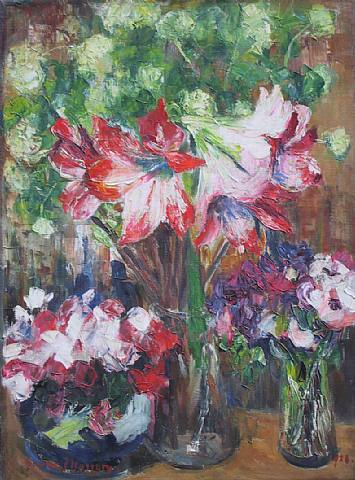
Nature morte d'amaryllis, 1928
