= Freese =

Freese is a surname of Frisian origin. Notable people with the surname include:

- David Freese (born 1983), American baseball player
- Ernst Freese (1925–1990), German molecular biologist
- Gene Freese (1934–2013), American baseball player
- George Freese (1926–2014), American baseball player
- Hermann Freese, 19th-century German painter
- Jason Freese (born 1975), American band musician
- Jeremy Freese (born 1971), American sociologist
- Josh Freese (born 1972), American session drummer and songwriter
- Katherine Freese (born 1957), American theoretical astrophysicist
- Louis Freese (aka B-Real) (born 1970), American rap artist
- Matthew Freese (born 1998), American soccer player
- Stephen Freese (1960–2024), American politician
- Stan Freese (born 1945), American tuba player
- Ulrich Freese (born 1951), German politician
