= Robert Franz =

German composer (1815–1892)

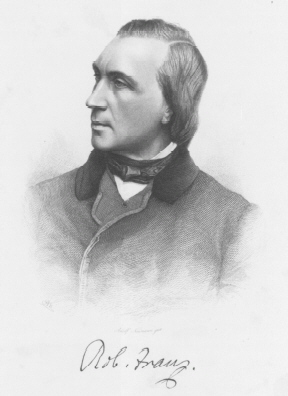
Robert Franz

Robert Franz Julius Knauth (28 June 1815 – 24 October 1892) was a German composer, mainly of Lieder.

== Biography ==
Franz was born in Halle, Germany, the son of Christoph Franz Knauth. In 1847, Christoph Knauth adopted his middle name Franz as his new surname, and his son followed suit.

He suffered in early life from the hostility of his parents to a musical career. He was twenty years old when his father's opposition was overcome and he was allowed to live in Dessau to study organ playing under Friedrich Schneider. The two years of study under that famous teacher were advantageous chiefly in making him uncommonly intimate with the works of Bach and Händel, his knowledge of which is shown in his editions of the former's St Matthew Passion, Magnificat and ten cantatas, and the latter's Messiah and L'Allegro, although some of these editions have long been controversial among musicians.

In 1843 he published his first book of songs, which was followed by about fifty further books, containing in all about 250 songs. In his native Halle he filled various public offices, including city organist and conductor of the Singakademie and the Symphony. He also served as royal music-director and music master at the university. The first book of songs was warmly praised by Mendelssohn, Liszt and Schumann, and the latter wrote a lengthy review of it in the Neue Zeitschrift für Musik and later published it separately as well.

Like Beethoven, he began to lose his hearing as early as 1841. Franz also had a nervous disorder that in 1868 compelled him to resign his offices. His future was then provided for by Franz Liszt, Joseph Joachim and others, who gave him the receipts of a concert tour amounting to some 100,000 marks.

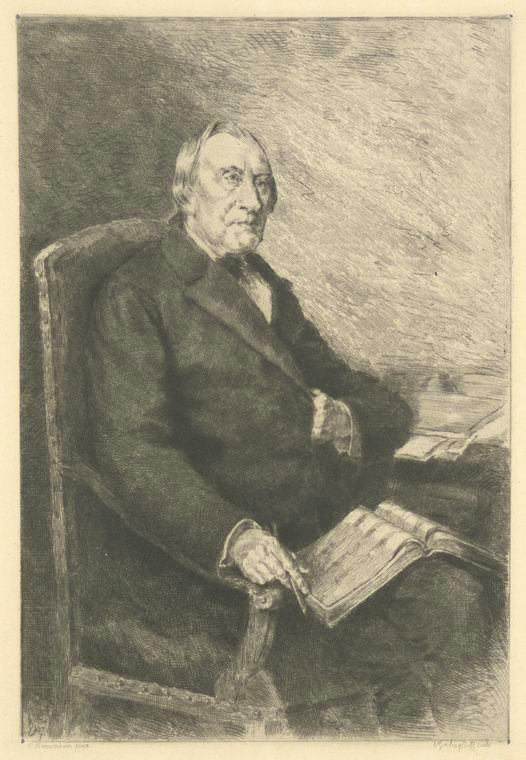
Franz in later life, by Valerian Gribayedoff, from a painting by Curt Herrmann

In 1878 or 1879, he made an extensive search for Bach manuscripts in various towns, villages and country houses in Germany. Supposedly, he discovered that in a park surrounding Schloss Witzthun where young trees were being protected from their supporting poles by paper instead of the customary cloth or leather. On examination, the paper turned out to be Bach manuscripts. After questioning the gardener, Franz found a trunk of them, including a number of violin sonatas. Although this account was printed in The New York Times, Franz declared it was "entirely untrue".

In addition to songs, he set the 117th Psalm for double choir and wrote a four-part Kyrie; he also edited Emanuele d'Astorga's Stabat Mater and Francesco Durante's Magnificat. On his seventieth birthday he published his only pianoforte piece. He also transcribed Schubert's String Quartet in D minor ("Death and the Maiden") for piano duet (1878) and made arrangements of Mozart's Quintets in C minor and C major.

He died in Halle.
