= Erich Büttner =

Erich Büttner may refer to:

- Erich Büttner (painter) (1889–1936), German painter
- Erich Büttner (pilot) (died 1945), German World War II fighter ace
