= Heckendorf =

Heckendorf is a toponymic surname of German origin from an unidentified location, a combination of the Middle Low German elements hecke, meaning "hedge fence", and dorf, meaning "hamlet village". Notable people with the surname include:

- Franz Heckendorf (1888–1962), German painter
- Keith Heckendorf (born 1981), American football coach
- Kole Heckendorf (born 1985), American football coach and player
