= Anna Costenoble =

German painter (1863–1930)

Anna Costenoble (1866–1930) was a German artist during the Symbolism art movement. Her primary artistic mediums are prints and paintings, with works featuring portraits, landscapes, and women as subjects. Despite the fact that her works remain unknown and unseen by many, Costenoble had a long and prosperous career as an artist.

== Education ==
In 1883, Costenoble studied under Karl Gussow at The Academy of the Fine Arts in Munich, Germany.

== Works ==
Costenoble was the illustrator of the book Penthesilea: Ein Frauenbrevier für männerfeindliche Stunden (Penthesileia. A Woman's Breviary for Man-Hating Moments) written by German feminist writer Leonie Meyerhof (1858-1933) in 1907. Within Meyerhof's book, Costenoble includes an illustration of Eve and the serpent. The print features a fully clothed Eve with a side-eye expression as she faces away from the serpent, depicted with the upper torso of a menacing-looking man.

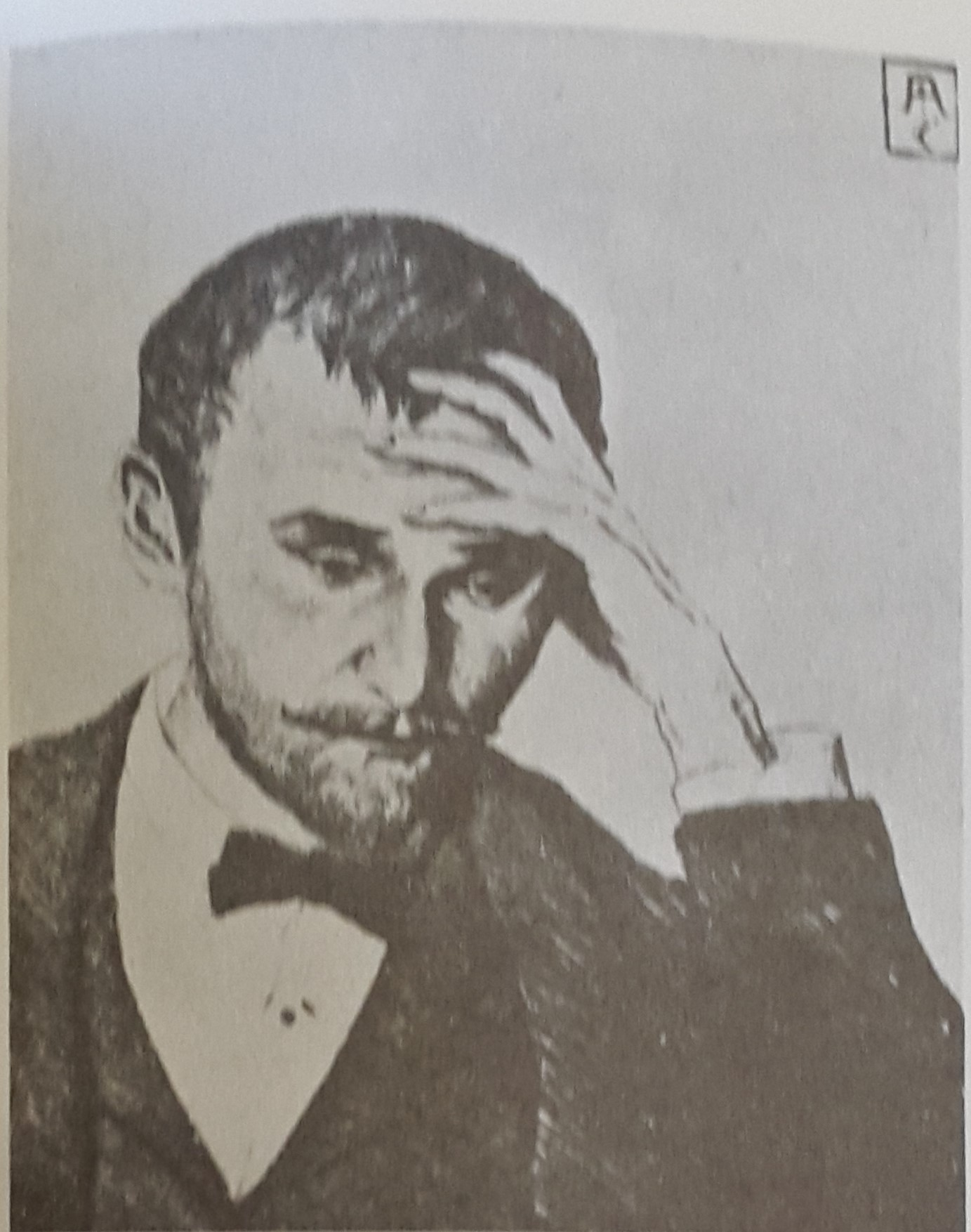
Stanisław Przybyszewski Portrait

One of Costenoble's etchings, "Tod und Leben Oder Erde und Hummel (Perception of Life and Death or Sky and Earth), served as the inspiration for a number of poems written by Polish novelist and dramatist Stanisław Przybyszewski, who was not only a fan of hers but also lover to Costenoble. Przybyszewski's poem utilized symbolic language to describe a sexual act between lightning (the sky) and a woman (earth), mirroring what is depicted in Costenoble's work. It describes how orgasmic intoxication unites death and life as mutually exclusive. Costenoble was well acquainted with both Stanisław Przybyszewski and his spouse Dagny Juel-Przybyszewska. Costenoble painted and etched several portraits of the pair both separately and as a couple during their relationship.

Prior to her later exhibition Tragedy of A Woman, Costenoble's work Conception was published in Moderni revue No. 3. Moderní revue was a magazine dedicated to the discussion of art theory and criticism of the visual arts. Later in the eighteenth century, the magazine began to concentrate on the themes of decadence and Symbolism. Both the magazine and Costenoble's artwork received a lawsuit in Prague on December 14, 1896, due to her work "violating public morality."

== Exhibitions ==
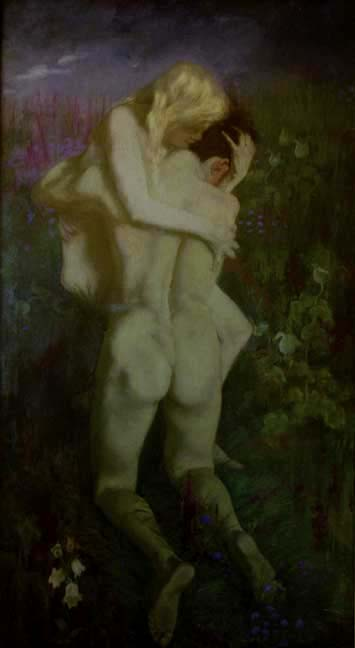
Tristan and Isolde. Germany, 1900.

Her artworks have been shown in a number of exhibitions, including the Vienna Secession Exhibition in 1899, which featured her aquatint Surf (1898). In 1900, 1901 and 1908, Costenoble took part in three separate Berlin Secession exhibitions.

=== Tragedy of A Women ===
Her personal exhibition The Tragedy of a Woman debuted in 1898 at the Topičův Salon located in Prague. The Topičův Salon was a main cultural center for young artists in the Second World War. Costenoble's works in the exhibition Tragedy of a Woman portrayed the nude female form in a variety of emotional states, frequently with sensual undertones. Her works that would be later included in this exhibition came under criticism both by the public and in the magazine Moderní revue due to its social and sexual provocativeness. The exhibition was also reviewed by writer and poet Karel Hlaváček.

Following the exhibition's criticism, Costenoble released a number of original etchings in the Vienna Secession newspaper in 1899 and the Bildner Kunst newspaper in 1905.
