= Berlin Secession =

German artistic movement

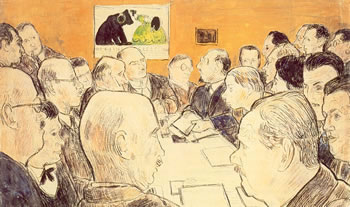
- Meeting of the Berlin Secession. From the left: Wilhelm Kohlhoff, Erich Büttner, Friedrich Scholz, Ernst Fritsch, Leo von König, Lovis Corinth, Ernst Oppler, Emil Orlik, Bruno Krauskopf, Charlotte Behrend-Corinth, Erich Waske, Franz Heckendorf by Ernst Oppler, 1921
- Years active: 1898–1913
- Location: Germany
- Major figures: Walter Leistikow, Franz Skarbina, Max Liebermann, Hermann Struck, and Edvard Munch
- Influenced: German Impressionism

The Berlin Secession was an art movement established in Germany on May 2, 1898. Formed in reaction to the Association of Berlin Artists, and the restrictions on contemporary art imposed by Kaiser Wilhelm II, 65 artists "seceded", demonstrating against the standards of academic or government-endorsed art. The movement is classified as a form of German Modernism, and came on the heels of several other secessions in Germany, including Jugendstil and the Munich Secession.

== History ==
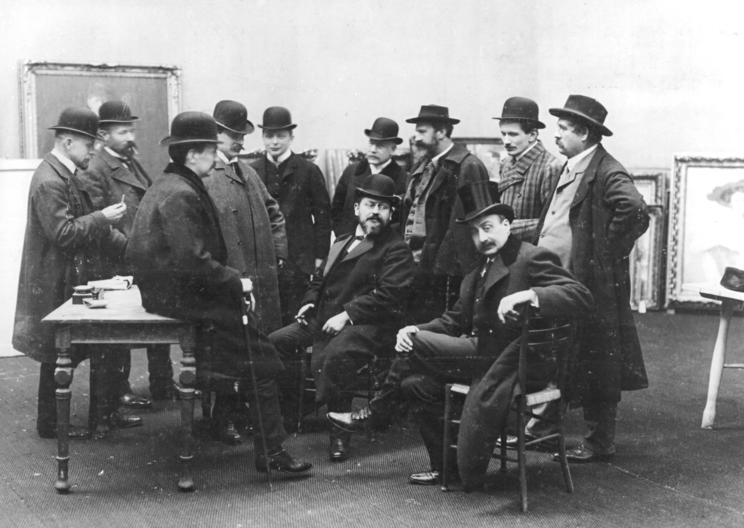
Jury for the Berlin Secession 1908 exhibition. From the left: sculptors Fritz Klimsch and August Gaul, painters Walter Leistikow and Hans Baluschek, art dealer Paul Cassirer, painters Max Slevogt (sitting) and George Mosson (standing), sculptor Max Kruse, painters Max Liebermann (sitting), Emil Rudolf Weiß and Lovis Corinth.

=== Rise and reign of the Secession ===
The upheavals that led to the formation of the Berlin Secession began in 1891 on the occasion of the Great International Art Exhibition in Berlin. A dispute began after the commission of the Association of Berlin Artists rejected images done by Edvard Munch. In May 1898, under the leadership of Walter Leistikow, Franz Skarbina and Max Liebermann, various artists converged to form a "free association for the organization of artistic exhibitions". This group was governed by a President, Max Liebermann, and a Secretary, Walter Leistikow, along with an executive committee. At the time of its inception, there was a total of 65 members, including both men and women as full members. All those involved in the Secession followed a constitution that defined terms of involvement in the group, and nothing could be changed without a three-fourths majority from the committee. The Free Union of the XXIV was founded in Munich and exhibited under this name in Berlin.

There was a variety of causes that led to the break in German art. In November 1892, a scandal occurred when an Edvard Munch exhibition was closed by a majority of the members of the Association of Berlin Artists. They described Munch's art as "repugnant, ugly and mean". Other artists in favor of Munch, however, were not yet organized enough to leave the established exhibition system of the academy.

Later, in 1898, the jury of the Great Berlin Art Exhibition rejected a landscape painting by the painter Walter Leistikow. Now the proof was finally provided that the "modern art" of the rising artists had no support from the academy. This was the final act of momentum needed to organize the secession. The president at the time, Max Liebermann, gave some demands by the Secession at the Great Berlin Art Exhibition in 1899. He asked that the secession receive quality space, no less than 8 rooms worth, with an independent jury and committee. However, the demands were refused on the grounds of having excessive conditions for such a small group. After delegations, a compromise was found, still favoring independence from the rest of the exhibitions, but fewer rooms.

Liebermann recruited the art dealers Bruno and Paul Cassirer and offered them to become executive secretaries of the Secession. They joined in 1899 and together had a seat on the board but without voting rights. They were responsible for the planning and execution of the building, which was built according to plans by Hans Grisebach at Kantstraße 12 (corner Fasanenstraße).

The split in German art was, incidentally, extremely well-accepted in the political sphere. There had been unrest in conservative groups towards the mixture of art in the annual salon. They believed immoral art should not be mingled in the same space as more traditional art, and they criticized the inclusion of foreign artists. However, they didn't outright demand their removal, only that they be given their own space to display work. This thinking lined up incredibly well with the wants of the Berlin Secession modernists, and made the split an easy transition for politics.

On May 19, 1899, an exhibition of 330 pictures and graphics and 50 sculptures was opened in Charlottenburger Kantstraße. Of the 187 exhibitors, 46 lived in Berlin and 57 in Munich. At this time, foreign contributions were still missing. The audience of 2000 invited guests were impressed and the exhibits were perceived as overcoming the prevailing mediocrity. The event was attended by those of high social standing as well- the audience not only contained the head of the salon, Max Koner, but the President of the Royal Academy, which helped it be perceived as a surprisingly respectable gathering.

At the second exhibition, the international claim was honored, of which 414 exhibits were over ten percent of foreign artists, including Pissarro, Renoir, Segantini and Whistler. This baffled nationalist circles, so that a conservative minority separated again until 1902 from the Secession. In addition to the summer exhibitions, there were also winter exhibitions reserved for graphics under the title "Black and White Exhibitions". At the 1902 exhibition, works by Kandinsky, Manet, Monet and Munch were shown for the first time. For the first time, the trend showed that Berlin Munich declined the rank of art metropolis Germany. When Germany wanted to participate with art in the St. Louis World's Fair in 1904, failed to reach an agreement of the commission to Anton von Werner and the Emperor with the Berlin Secession.

In 1905, the relocation to the then-new larger building on Kurfürstendamm 208, the place where today the theater on Kurfürstendamm is located. Jury members this year were Heinrich Reifferscheid, Philipp Franck, Leo von König, Lovis Corinth and Ernst Oppler. In the same year, Gerhart Captain was appointed honorary member.

On May 5, 1909, there was a private performance of the Russian Court Ballet in the Krolloper. Among the visitors were Max Slevogt, Georg Kolbe, Fritz Klimsch and Ernst Oppler, as well as representatives of the press. The ballet and the tennis courts were among the most popular motifs of the Berlin Secession.

=== Artistic style and influence ===
The style of German art at the time was closely influenced by France, whether or not artists were attempting to replicate the French style or distance themselves from it. During the late Imperial period, from around 1888 to around 1918, ideas of nationalism and a political interest in art became more popularized. Germans were interested in what it meant to be German, and what it meant to have a cultural identity through artistic style. People wanted Germany to have an individual artistic identity. France had influenced the artistic world in Germany for so long, but at this point, both artists and consumers had begun to reject what was called French Naturalism, and garnering more interest in German Idealism. A member of the Berlin Secession, Karl Scheffler, categorized the differences in the artistic styles, perception and conception. Perception dictated painting of the natural world and what was physical around you. This was seen as the French way of art. Germans were conceptual painters, who took ideas and gave them form, and preferred to gain inspiration from their own thoughts.

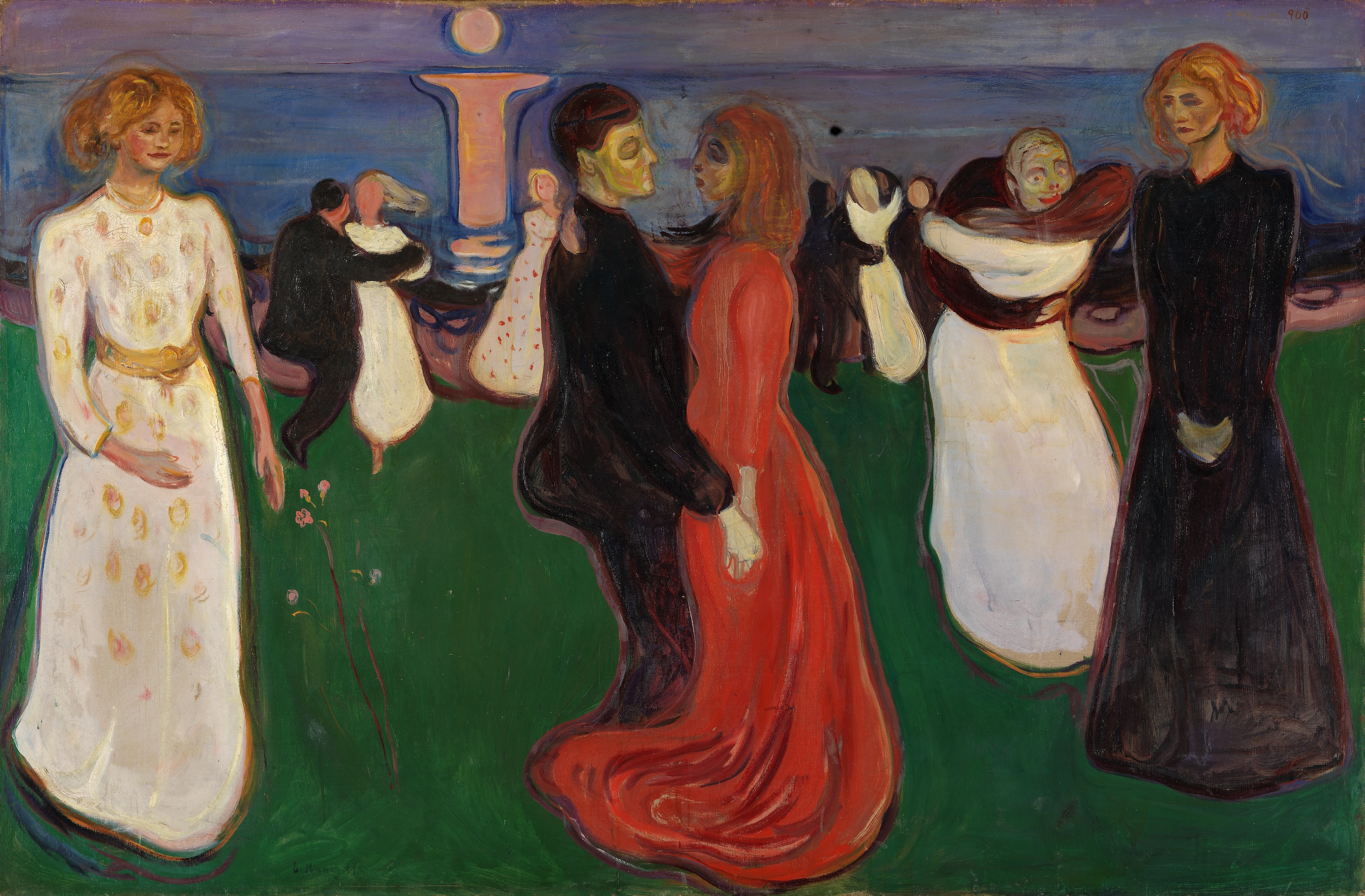
Painting by Edvard Munch, The Dance of Life, 1899–1900

This way of thinking about German art can explain the differences in art styles of the Berlin secession. Expressionistic artists like Emil Nolde and Edvard Munch were exhibiting with artists who stayed closer to ideas of German Modernism and Impressionism, like Max Liebermann and Walter Leistikow. Although they had artistic differences, they were all painting from the ideas and the thoughts they had at the time.

=== Conflicts and splits ===
The Berlin Secession had developed from the countermovement to the recognized size of the art business. Many important artists were active or joined, in 1906 it was August Kraus, in 1907 it was Max Beckmann, Bernhard Pankok, Hans Purrmann, and Emil Rudolf Weiß, 1908 Ernst Barlach, Wassily Kandinsky and Emil Orlík, 1909 Lyonel Feininger, 1910 Rudolf Grossmann and 1911 Hans Meid. Around 1909, the Berlin Secession consisted of 97 members. There was still criticism from conservative circles, who consider the Berlin impressionism as decadent and a threat to German art, such as the nationalist Werdandi-Bund. From an artistic point of view, the Secession was very tolerant, even towards opposing positions: none of the representatives of the Secession, who were close to German impressionism, viewed Paul Baum's approach to pointillism in the style of French Post-Impressionism as negative.

The success was accompanied by economic interests and the despotic behavior of the art dealer Paul Cassirer. Thus, it is narrated by Emil Nolde that Cassirer called the artists his slaves. In particular, artists who had no chance to exhibit at Cassirer, believed the exhibition of the Secession to have disadvantages.

After 27 mostly Expressionist artists had been rejected by the jury, it came in 1910 to withdraw, including Max Beckmann. On the initiative of Georg Tappert, Heinrich Richter-Berlin and others, including Otto Mueller and Max Pechstein, through whom the Dresdner Künstlergruppe Brücke was added, formed a new group, the New Secession. In May they opened their first exhibition "Rejected of the Secession Berlin 1910". Pechstein was elected president, Tappert chairman. After a fierce dispute between Emil Nolde and President Max Liebermann, Nolde was expelled from the Secession, and a little later Liebermann and his closest associates resigned from office. The successor to Liebermann in 1911 was Lovis Corinth. After he suffered a stroke, he could no longer perform the office.

Numerous artists were dependent on the sales of the art dealers Bruno and Paul Cassirer, sometimes even being denied their livelihood in this way. Paul Cassirer ran and was elected the first chairman. He organized the summer exhibition of 1913. Although this was very successful, there were also 13 (mostly younger) members who could not be exhibited. These then organized their own exhibition and did not follow the call to leave the Secession. In an attempt to solve the problems, Max Neumann, Ernst Oppler, and Adolph Herstein, among others, met with Max Liebermann in his studio. They agreed on a desegregation Cassirers on June 6, 1913. Oppler held the scene in his work consultation in the studio. Art criticism interpreted the picture as planning the break with Cassirer. In fact, the depicted persons Hermann Struck, Emil Pottner, Ernst Bischoff-Culm, Max Neumann and Herstein, along with Corinth, were the members who remained loyal to the Secession. Although Lovis Corinth took over again, the break was unstoppable. Around 40 artists left the Secession, including Slevogt and Liebermann and even Paul Cassirer. In March 1914, some of the departed founded the Free Secession, which existed until 1924, with Max Liebermann as Honorary President. A little later, the "Juryfreie Kunstausstellung" opened, which allowed a picture market entirely without a jury, art dealers, or groupings. Oppler did not resign from the Secession, but renounced future participation in the annual exhibitions of the increasingly Expressionist Berlin Secessionists.

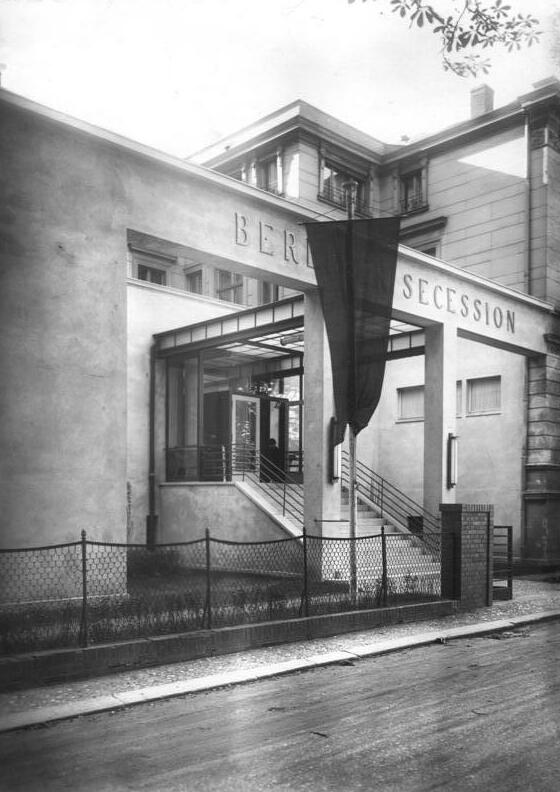
Building of the Berlin Secession in Tiergartenstraße 21a

=== A national influence ===
The Berlin Secession was extremely successful after the incident at the Saint Louis International Exposition. The recognition they developed allowed their influence over German art to increase, bringing the term 'German Impressionism' into use. This was the style that was most closely associated with the Secession. It also allowed the middle class of Berlin to get a foothold in German art, as the liberal ideals of the movement opened doors for those of a lower class to learn new vocations within the art world. Even those who opposed the viewpoint of the Secession members benefited from their existence. Art created in opposition to the movement also had its own brand of popularity.

However, that being said, the Berlin Secession capitalized well on the division between perspectives. The most popular artists at the time were almost all associated with art that didn't fit in the traditional mold of the academy. The power in the Secession was that it allowed multiple styles to exist in the same space- unlike the academy, which demanded that only one be adhered to. Journals like Die Kunsthalle, that wrote in opposition to the Secession, went out of business.

The Emperor, up until this point, had either let the Secession work as it would, or mildly supported it. He viewed change as a good thing, and it had been politically beneficial for him to allow it to develop. Nonetheless, he constantly attempted to interfere with matters like the jury of the salon, which caused conflicts in the art community. While having little power in many aspects of the governing of an autocratic society, the Emperor did have some influence in the cultural sphere. This made him an important factor in the Secession's public and financial success.

=== Berlin Secession during National Socialism ===
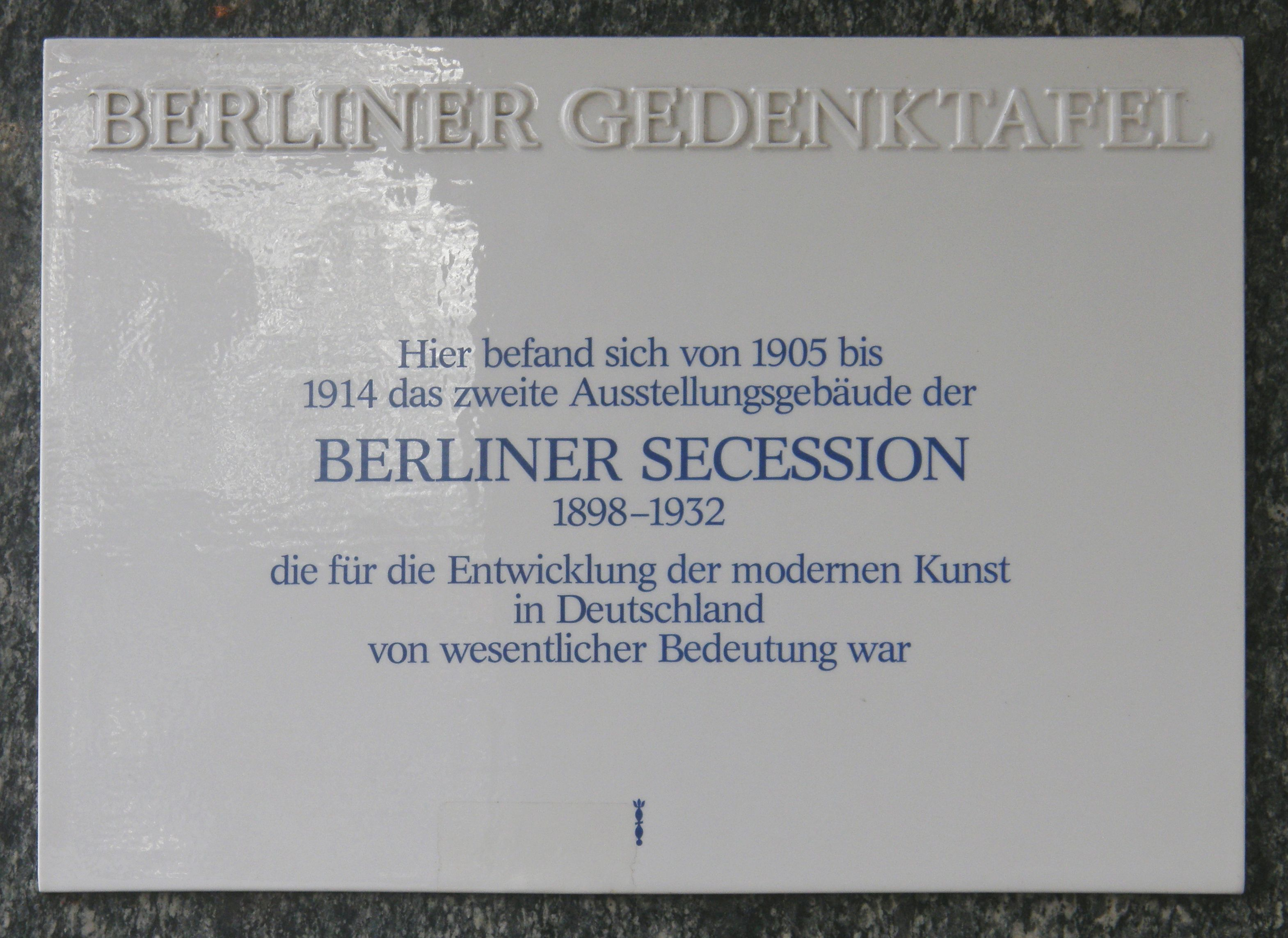
Memorial plaque for the Berlin Secession on Kurfürstendamm 208

The First World War created a negative impact on the Secession. The cultural policy during the period of National Socialism led to a lasting damage that made the once influential artists' association meaningless.

After the seizure of power by the National Socialists in February 1933, a new board was elected, which included, among others, Max Pechstein, Eugene Spiro, Magnus Zeller, Hans Purrmann, Bruno Krauskopf and Rudolf Belling. At the meeting of March 10, 1933, Pechstein spoke about the position of some members of the Secession, and emphasized that no policy should be carried into the Secession. A week later, however, the possible cooperation with the Nazi regime and the Kampfbund for German culture was discussed. Eugene Spiro resigned from his position on the executive board, and further withdrawals were made in April 1933. At an important meeting on April 25, 1933, Pechstein read a statement to the government in which the Berlin Secession undertook to help build the new Germany. Emil van Hauth, a member of the Secession since 1932, read a program he had designed that was in the spirit of the National Socialist Kampfbund. Accordingly, Jewish artists and those who were disparagingly called Bolshevik were no longer allowed to be members of German artists' associations. At the same time he called for a transformation of the Secession in the sense of the new state and its so-called German art. The bill was accepted by 27 votes to 2 with one abstention.

Subsequently, the statutes were changed, and on May 2, Emil van Hauth, Artur Degener and Philipp Harth were elected to the new board. All three were members of the Kampfbund for German Culture. At a meeting in the Prussian Ministry of Culture, as it later turned out, van Hauth vilified the Secession as an assembly with a Marxist attitude and wanted to achieve dissolution. In the Secession van Hauth, on the other hand, reported that the Berlin Secession was no longer wanted by the government and that a dissolution by the Gestapo was possible. On June 16, 1933, the board was expanded, but no chairman elected. Emil van Hauth resigned from the community on September 28, 1933. On October 12, 1933, the liquidation of the association was discussed, which, however, many artists who were interested in the continued existence, rejected.

At a further appointment in the Ministry of Culture, the board member Adolf Strübe managed to convince the responsible speaker that there had never been anti-state or political tendencies on the part of the artist community and that the association was loyal to the Hitler government. In April 1934, Ernst Barlach, Lyonel Feininger and Erich Heckel were elected to the community. The logbook was conducted from 1915 to 19 April 1934. In a document, a page of the Berliner Lokal-Anzeiger of January 26, 1936, is reported by the annual meeting of the Berlin Secession, where Adolf Strübe was re-elected chairman, as his deputy painter Franz Lenk was determined. The sculptor Ernesto de Fiori and Herbert Garbe also belonged to the board. Lenk and Fiori were artists of the new objectivity. Garbe, the first member of the November Group, joined the NSDAP in 1933. Presumably, the Berlin Secession continued even after 1936.

=== Lasting effects and Jewish influence ===
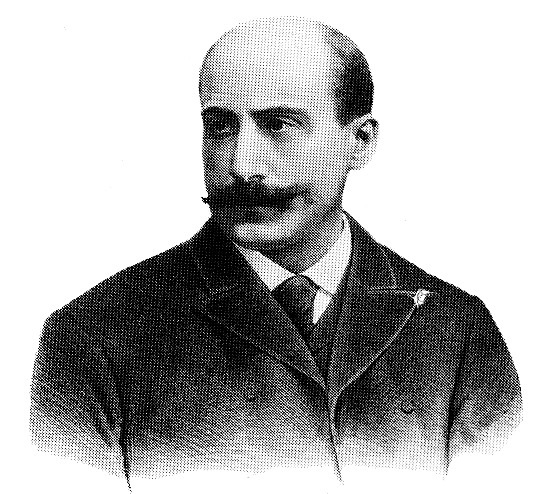
Max Liebermann, age 48

The Berlin Secession opened cultural, political, and class doors that paved the way for Germany to have, briefly, a spot in the artistic limelight before WWII. While being mostly associated Modernism, it created a space where later Expressionists could integrate themselves into, even after the dissolution of the Secession members. Many of the patrons and artists were of wealthy Jewish descent, and while they were specifically targeted during WWII, the ideas they shared during the Secession have survived long after. The Berlin Secession also had leaders within the Jewish community, like Max Liebermann, who was the initial president. The secession was a space where people coming from different backgrounds could work together to influence a new culture.

== Notable members ==
- Hans Baluschek (1870–1935)
- Ernst Barlach (1870–1938)
- Paul Baum (1859–1932)
- Max Beckmann (1884–1950)
- Charlotte Berend-Corinth (1880–1967)
- Josef Block (1863–1943)
- Martin Brandenburg (1870–1919)
- Erich Büttner (1889–1936)
- Lovis Corinth (1858–1925)
- Anna Costenoble (1863–1930)
- Charles Crodel (1894–1973)
- Heinrich Harry Deierling (1894–1989)
- Ludwig Dettmann (1865–1944)
- Adolph Eckhardt (1868–1942)
- Otto Heinrich Engel (1866–1949)
- Lyonel Feininger (1871–1956)
- Philipp Franck (1860–1944)
- Oskar Frenzel (1855–1915)
- Oswald Galle (1868–1935)
- August Gaul (1869–1921)
- Robert Genin (1884–1941)
- Rudolf Großmann (1882–1941)
- Hugo von Habermann (1849–1929)
- Karl Hagemeister (1848–1933)
- Theodor Hagen (1842–1919)
- Philipp Harth (1885–1968)
- Emil van Hauth (1899–1974)
- Erich Heckel (1883–1970)
- Franz Heckendorf (1888–1962)
- Adolf Edward Herstein (1869–1932)
- Curt Herrmann (1854–1929)
- Dora Hitz (1856–1924)
- Ferdinand Hodler (1853–1918)
- Ludwig von Hofmann (1861–1945)
- Richard Hohly (1902–1995)
- Ulrich Hübner (1872–1932)
- Willy Jaeckel (1888–1944)
- Franz M. Jansen (1885–1958)
- Ernst Ludwig Kirchner (1880–1938)
- Fritz Klimsch (1870–1960)
- Paul Klimsch (1868–1917)
- Max Klinger (1857–1920)
- Wilhelm Kohlhoff (1893–1971)
- Georg Kolbe (1877–1947)
- Käthe Kollwitz (1867–1945)
- Leo von König (1871–1944)
- August Kraus (1868–1934; vice-president from 1911 to 1913)
- Bruno Krauskopf (1892–1960)
- Max Kruse (1854–1942)
- Walter Leistikow (1865–1908)
- Franz Lenk (1898–1968)
- Reinhold Lepsius (1857–1922)
- Sabine Lepsius (1864–1942)
- Max Liebermann (1847–1935)
- Heinrich Eduard Linde-Walther (1868–1939)
- Otto Modersohn (1865–1943)
- Marg Moll (1884–1977)
- Oskar Moll (1875–1947)
- George Mosson (1851–1933)
- Edvard Munch (1863–1944)
- Emil Nolde (1867–1956)
- Ernst Oppler (1867–1929)
- Ernestina Orlandini (1869–1965)
- Emil Orlik (1870–1932)
- Waldemar Rösler (1882–1916)
- Max Schlichting (1866–1937)
- Karl Schmidt-Rottluff (1884–1976)
- Clara Siewert (1862–1945)
- Renée Sintenis (1888–1965)
- Franz Skarbina (1849–1910)
- Maria Slavona (1865–1931)
- Max Slevogt (1868–1932)
- Eugene Spiro (1874–1972)
- Robert Sterl (1867–1932)
- Adolf Strübe (1881–1973)
- Hermann Struck (1876–1944)
- Wilhelm Trübner (1851–1917)
- Lesser Ury (1861–1931)
- Max Uth (1863–1914)
- Arnold Waldschmidt (1873–1958)
- Karl Walser (1877–1943)
- Robert Walser (secretary for seven months in 1907) (Note: Walser narrates his experience as secetary in a 1917 prose piece "The Secretary", included in the 2012 collection Berlin Stories)
- Emil Rudolf Weiß (1875–1942)
- Hedwig Weiß (1860–1923)
- Julie Wolfthorn (1864–1944)
- Heinrich Zille (1858–1929)

== Gallery ==
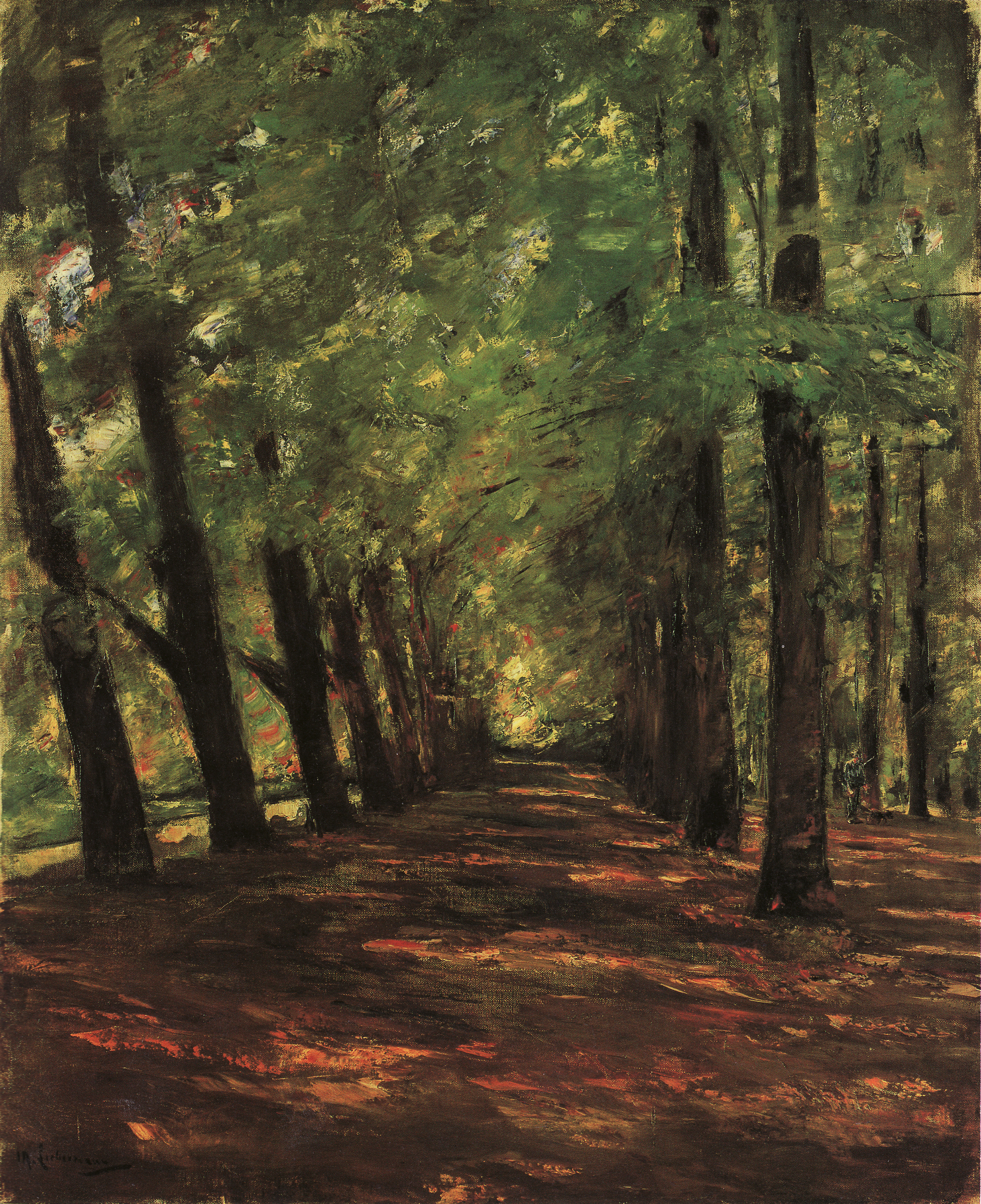
Max Liebermann: Allee in Overveen

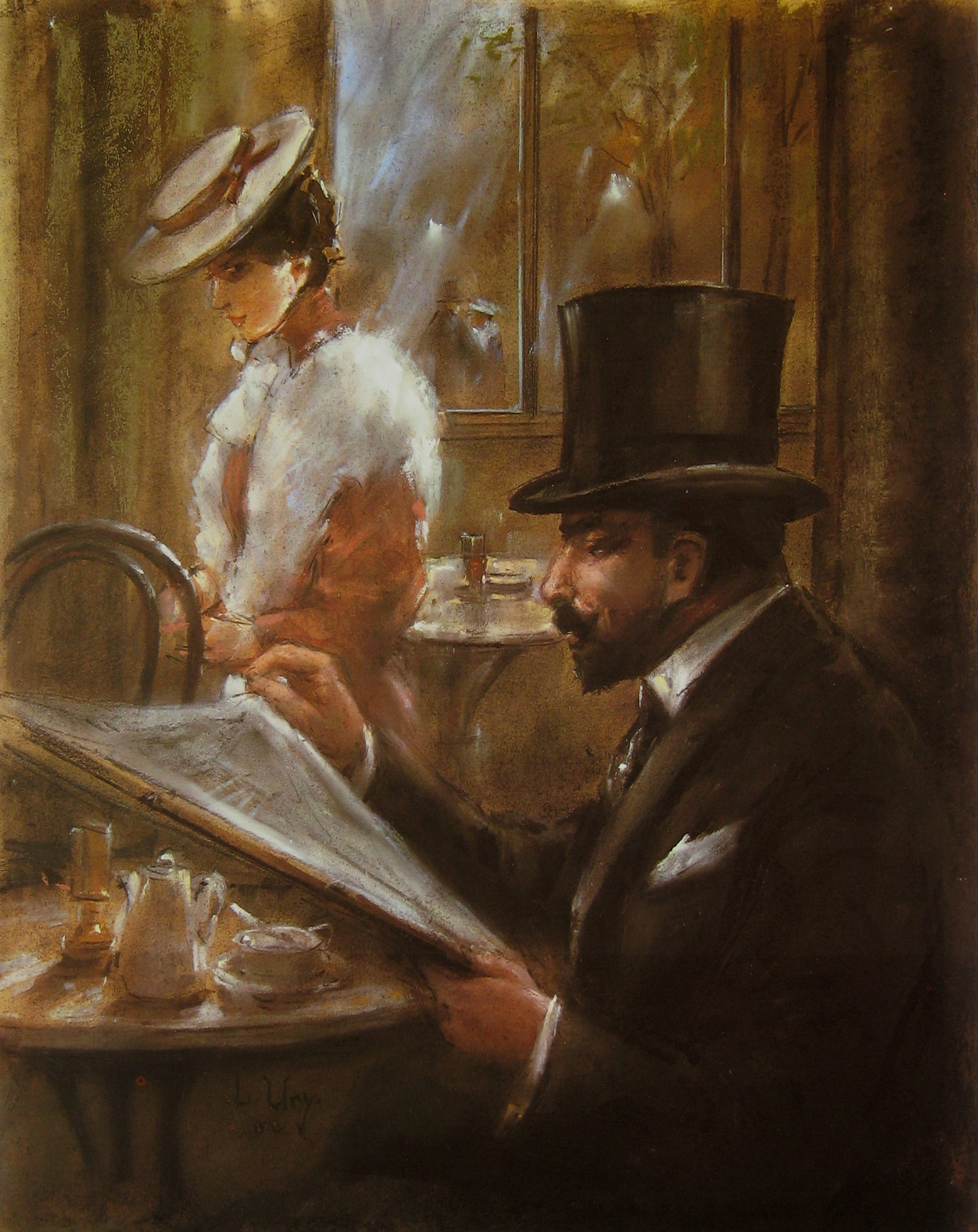
Lesser Ury: Cafe Bauer

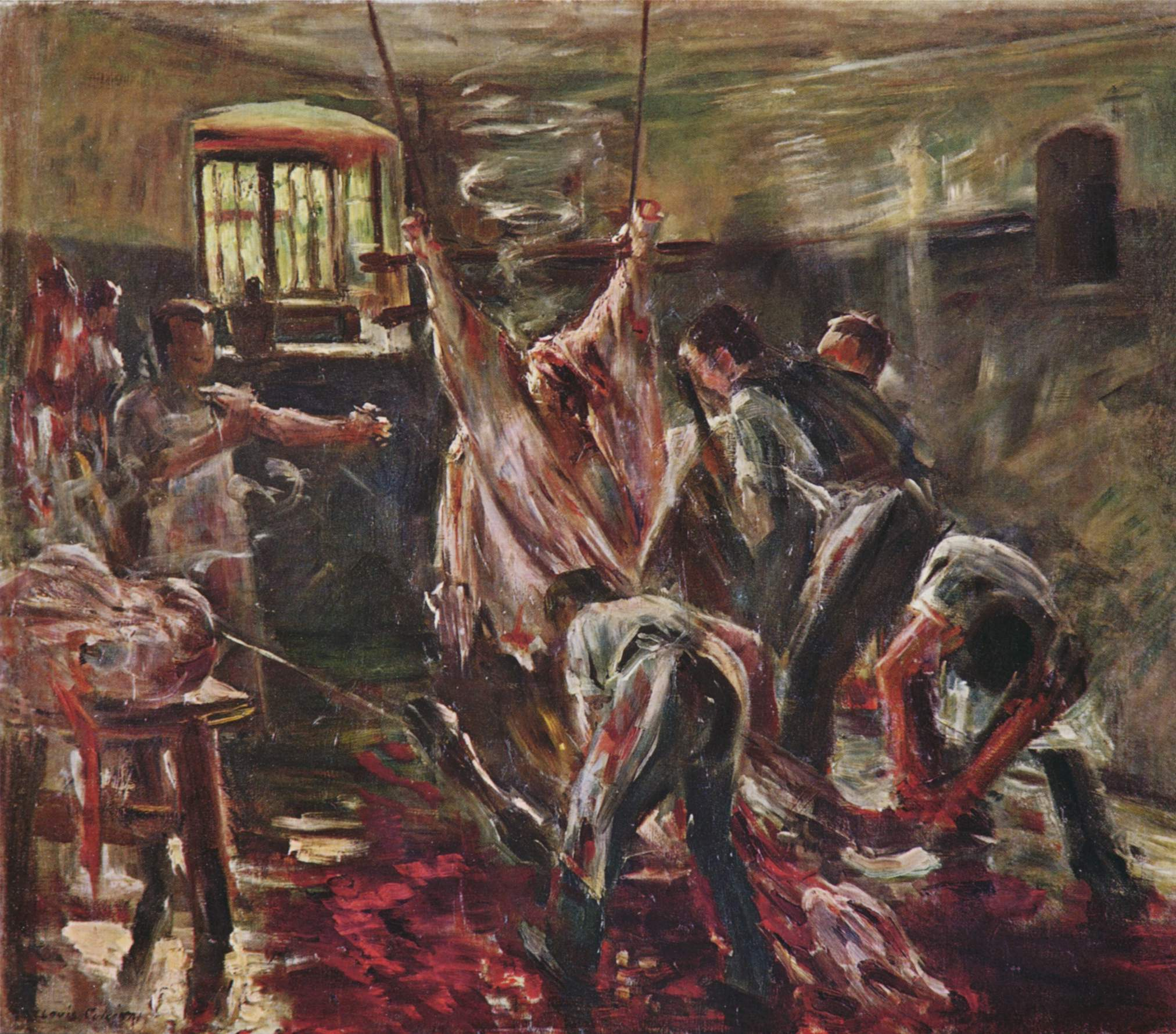
Lovis Corinth: In the Slaughterhouse

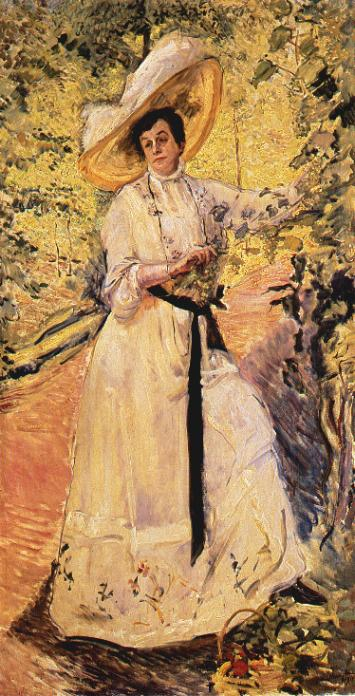
Max Slevogt: Nini am Weinspalier

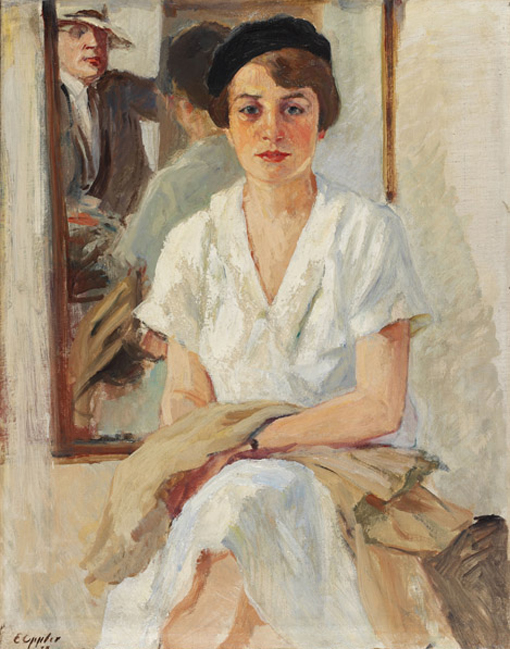
Ernst Oppler: Der Maler und Jo

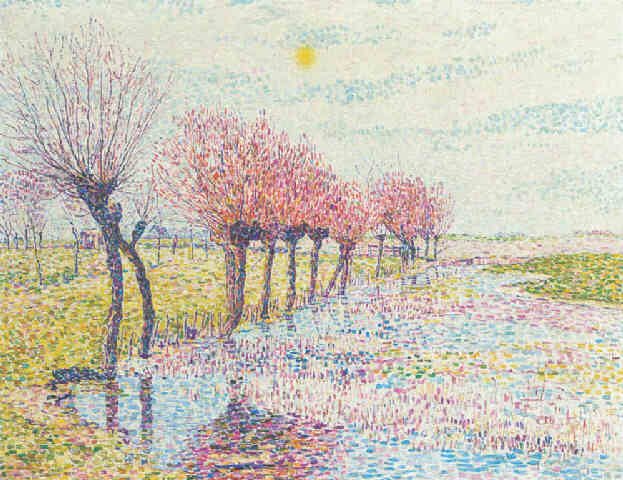
Paul Baum: Spring

Emil Nolde: Garden of Flowers

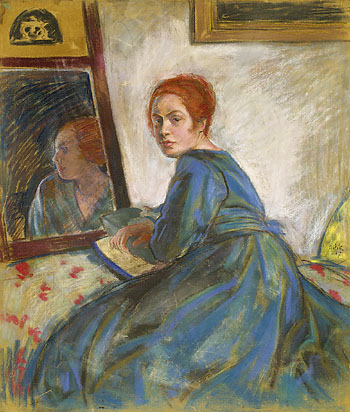
Emil Orlik: Unknown Woman, 1917

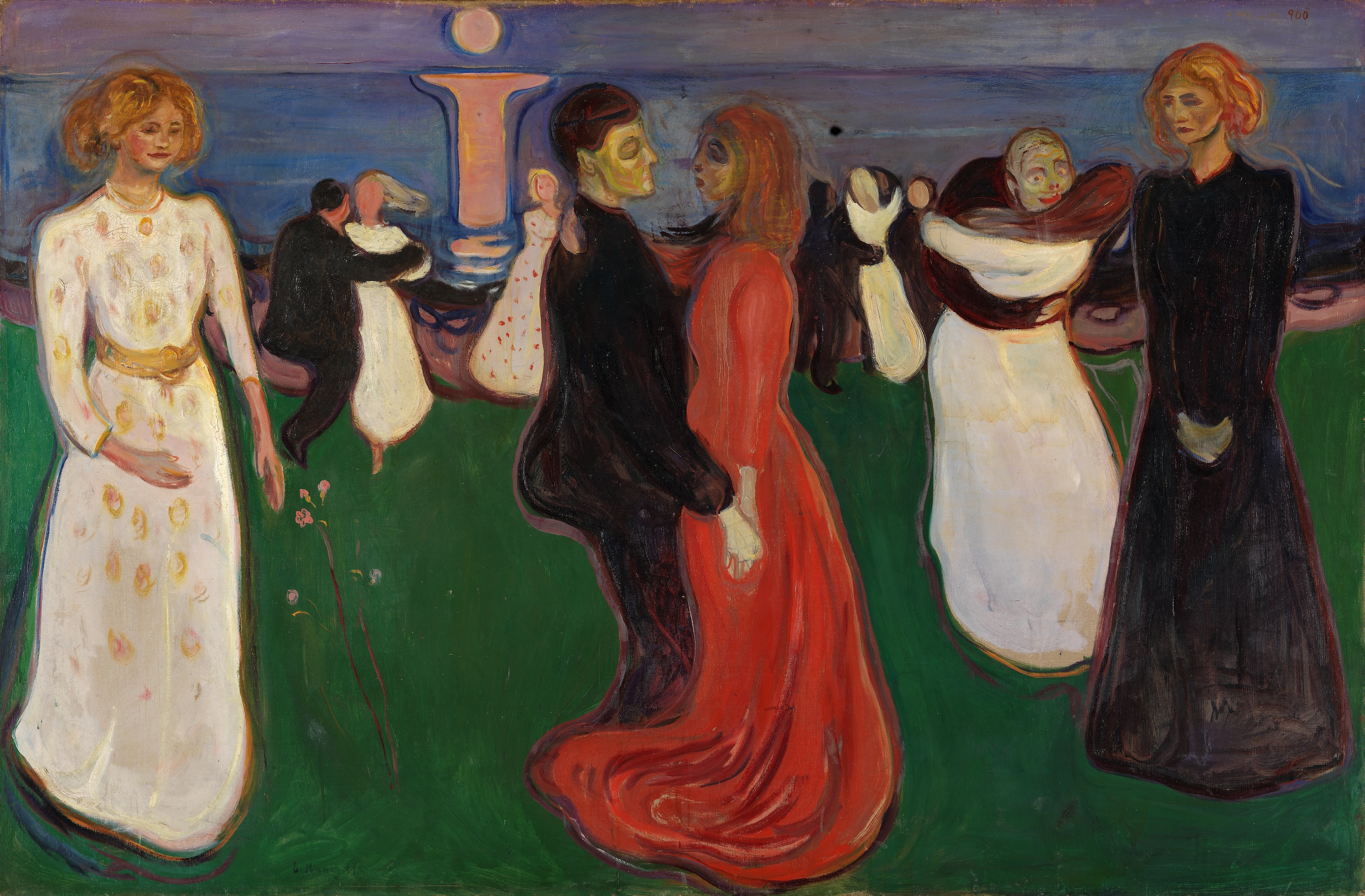
Edvard Munch: The Dance of Life, 1899–1900

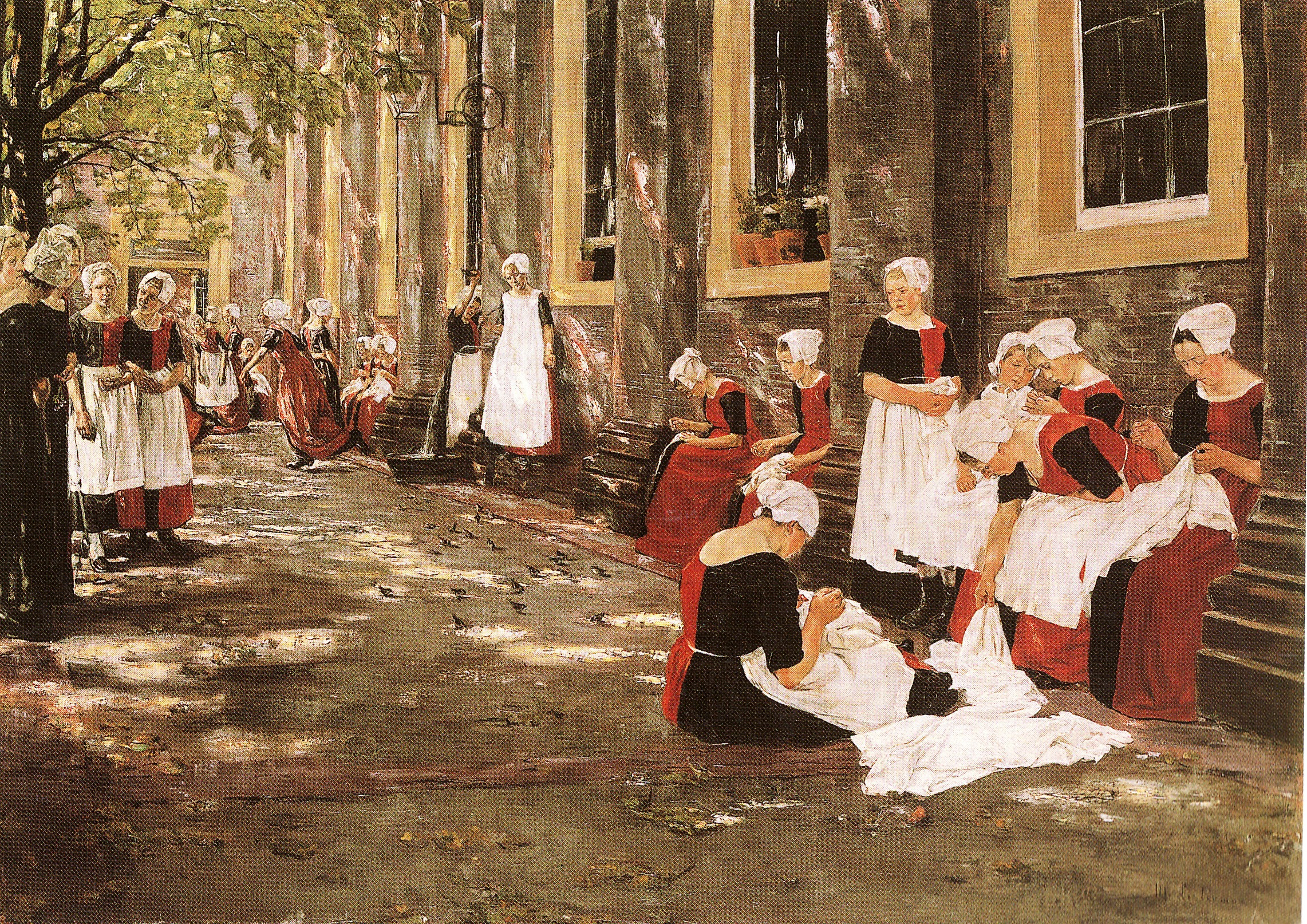
Max Liebermann: The Courtyard of the Orphanage in Amsterdam: Free Period in the Amsterdam Orphanage, 1882

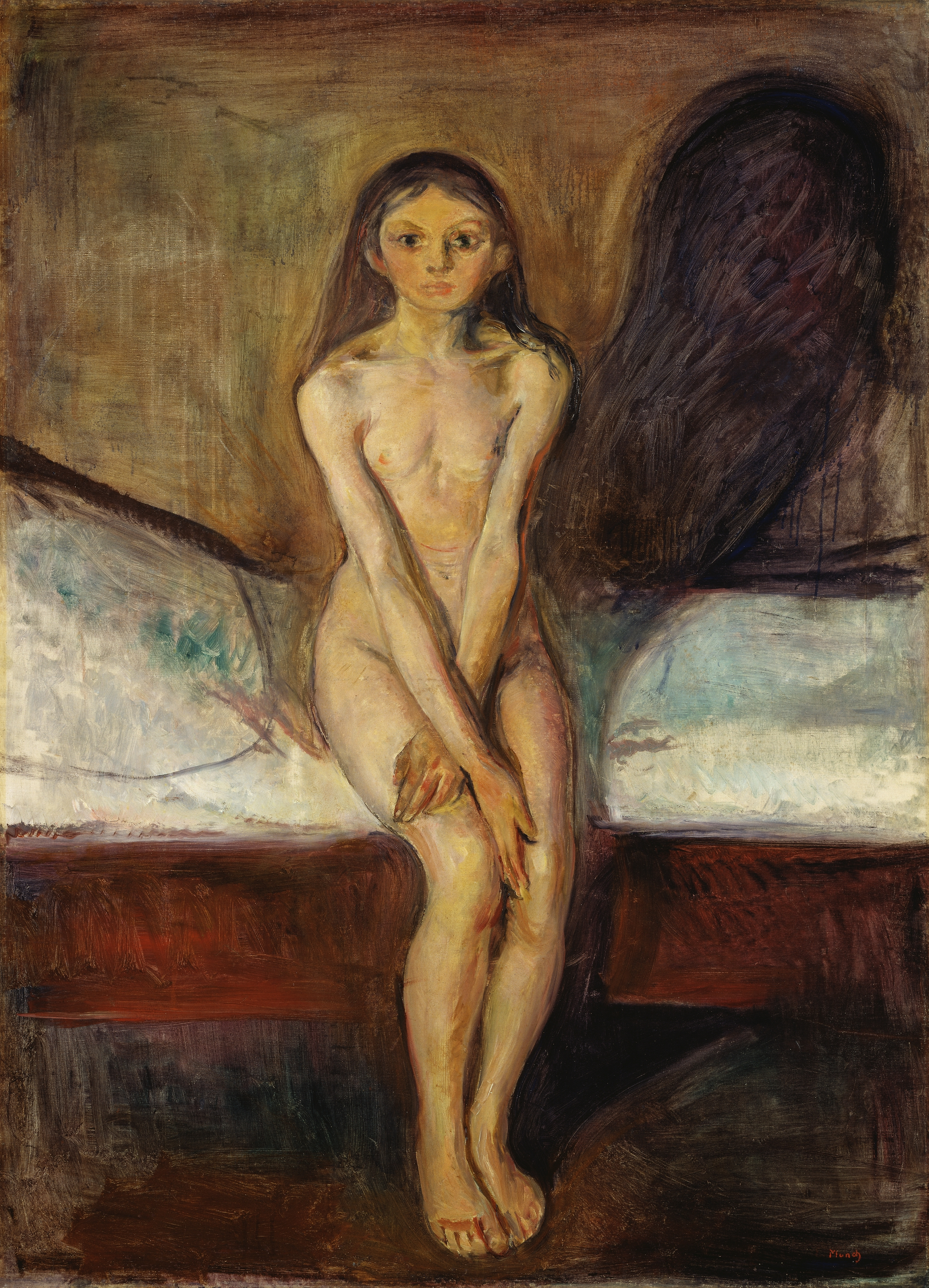
Edvard Munch: Puberty, 1894–1895

Walter Leistikow: Grunewalksee or Schlachtensee, 1900

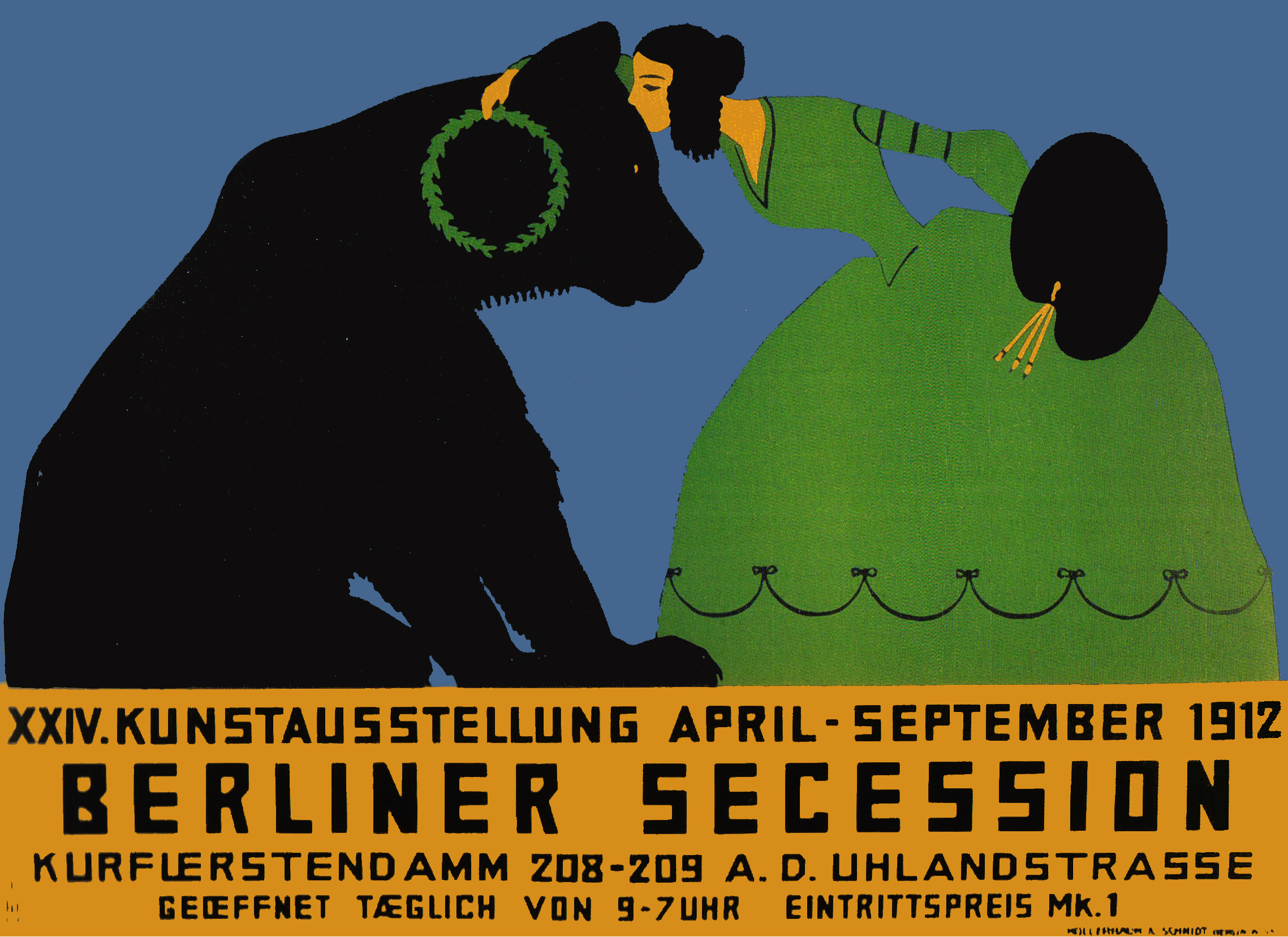
Poster for the 1912 exhibition
