= Leo von König =

German painter

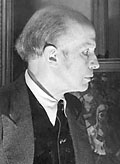
- Born: 28 February 1871; Braunschweig, German Empire
- Died: 19 April 1944 (aged 73); Tutzing, Nazi Germany
- Known for: Portrait painting
- Movement: Berlin Secession

Leo Freiherr von König (1871-1944) was a German painter and member of the Berlin Secession.

== Biography ==
Leo was the eldest son of Götz von König, a military officer who later became a General of the Cavalry, and his wife Baroness Hertha von Cramm (1847–1934).

From 1889 to 1894, he attended the Prussian Academy of Art then, from 1894 to 1897, the Académie Julian in Paris, where he studied with Jules Lefebvre and Tony Robert-Fleury.

After 1900, he lived in Berlin. He married one of his students, Anna von Hansemann (1897-1992) and she frequently served as his model. He was one of the late comers to the Berlin Secession. Among his best-known portraits are those of Gerhart Hauptmann, Ernst Barlach, Emil Nolde, Käthe Kollwitz and Eugen d’Albert.

He also created portraits of Reichsminister Bernhard Rust and Joseph Goebbels and posed for his friend, the sculptor Arno Breker.

In 1933 he became a Rotarian.

He represented Germany in one of the art competitions at the 1936 Summer Olympics. He was not well thought of by Adolf Hitler, however, and his works were removed from the "Großen Deutschen Kunstausstellung" at the Haus der Kunst in 1937. He was commissioned to paint a portrait of Prince Bernhard of Lippe-Biesterfeld in 1938, and stayed with the Dutch royals at Soestdijk Palace.

Von König was nominated by Albert Bormann for the Goethe Medal in 1941, but was not selected. Soon after, he was named an honorary member of the Academy of Fine Arts, Vienna, by Baldur von Schirach. He was also a member of the Deutscher Künstlerbund.

In 1943, after his studio in Berlin was destroyed by an Allied bombing, he moved to Tutzing, where he died the following year.

== Selected paintings ==
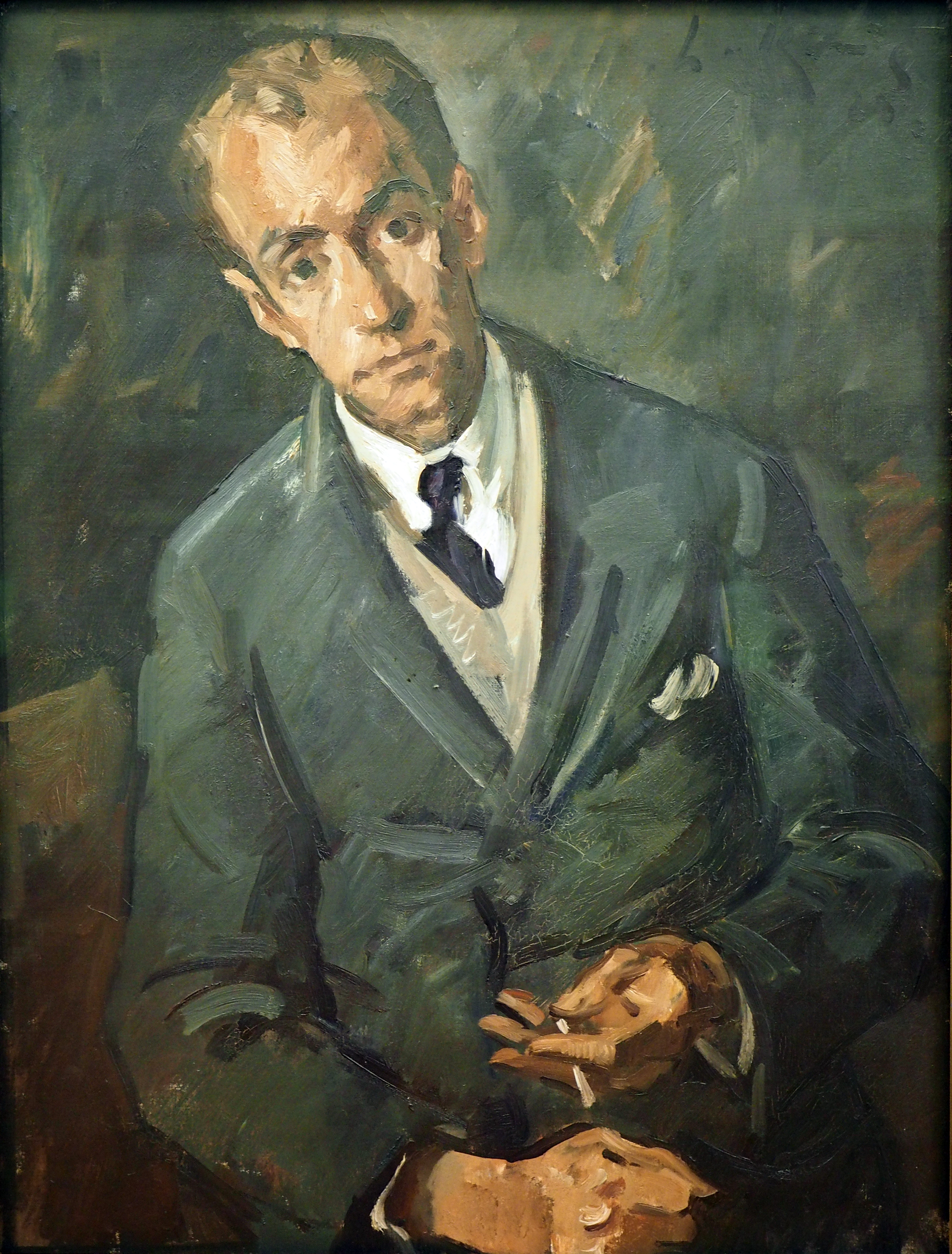
Portrait of the art historian, Fritz Nemitz

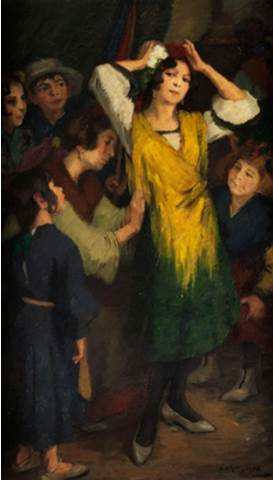
Before the Dance

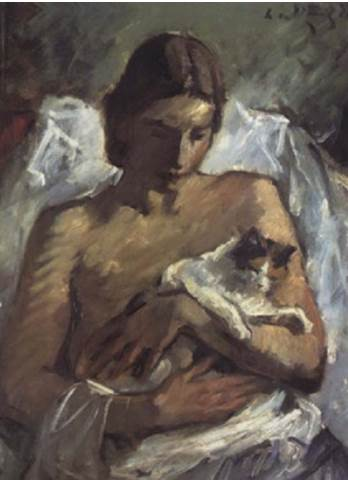
Young Woman (his wife, Anna) with a Cat

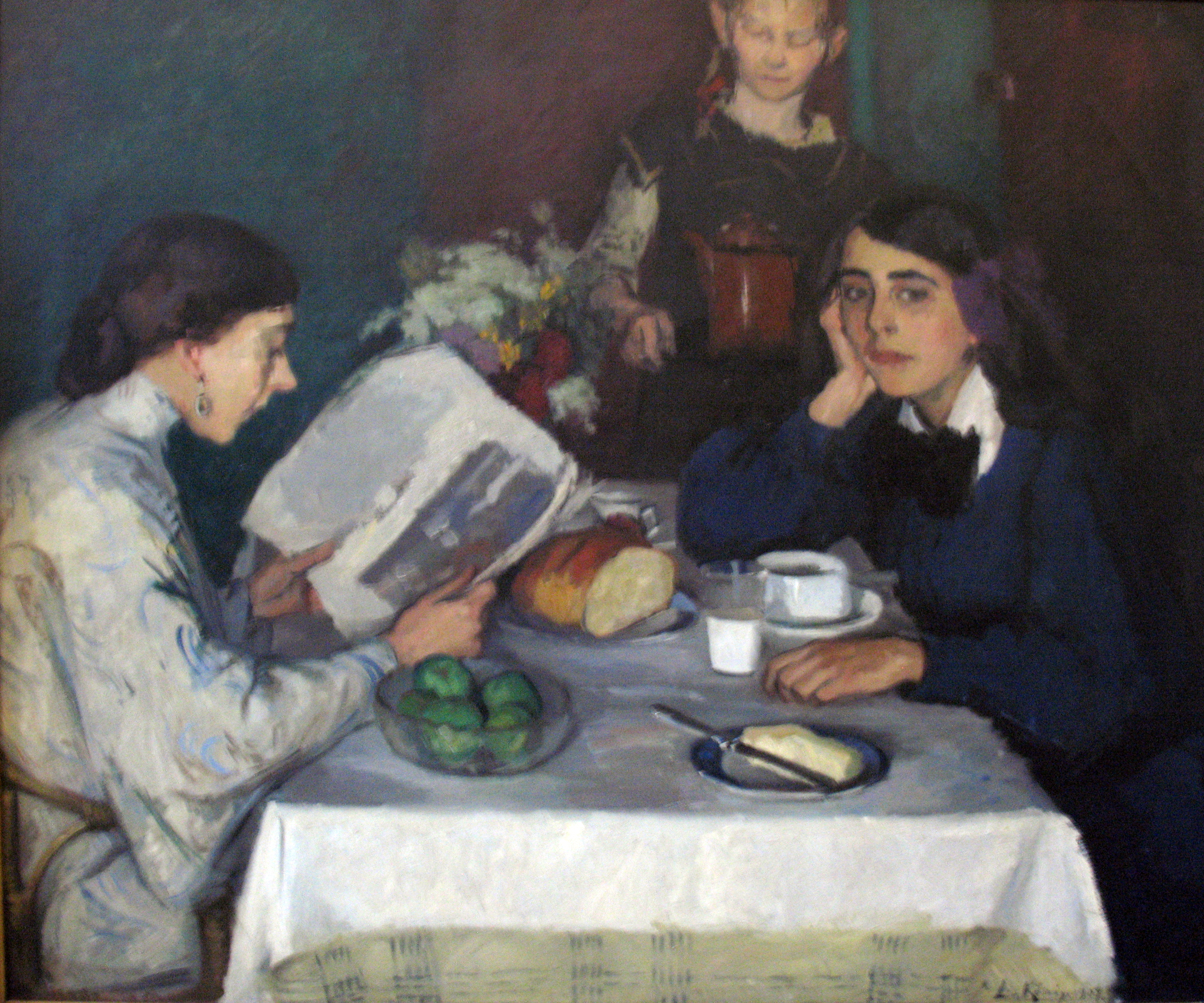
At the Breakfast Table
