= Max Schlichting =

German painter (1866-1937)

Max Schlichting (born Max von Schlichting; June 16, 1866, Sagan – June 23, 1937, Bad Tölz) was a painter of German Impressionism. Schlichting, who also worked as a professor and art official, is known for French subjects and depictions of landscapes in Flanders and the Netherlands.

== Life ==
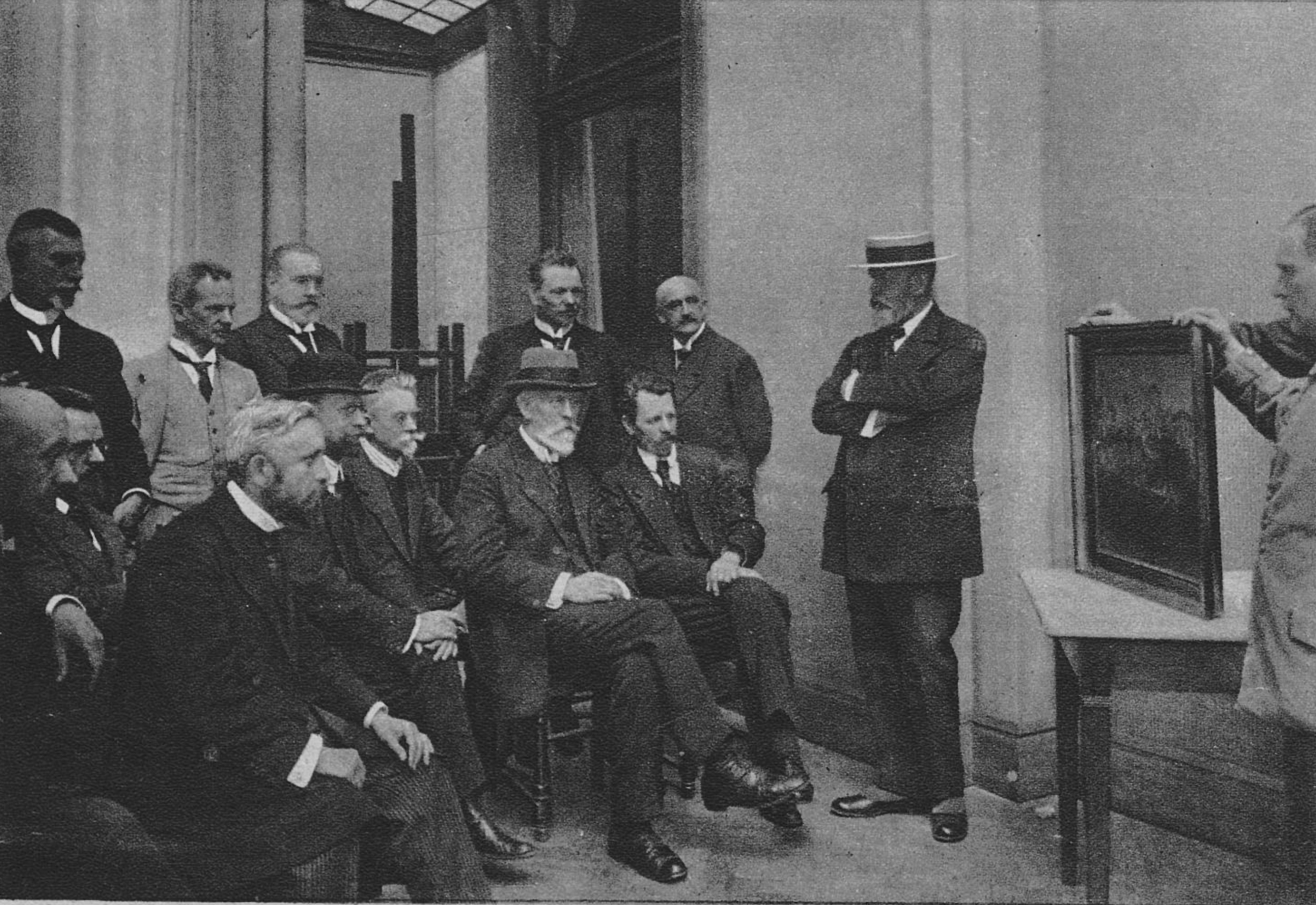
The second from right, Schlichting in the jury of the Great Berlin Art Exhibition

Max Schlichting was the son of Julius Schlichting a professor of hydraulic engineering at the TH Charlottenburg. He studied at the Prussian Academy of Arts (1885 to 1892) at Franz Skarbina, Woldemar Friedrich and Eugen Bracht and then at the Académie Julian in Paris. In 1896 his son Waldemar was born, who later became a marine painter. The family lived in Berlin at 99 Knesebeckstrasse.

Schlichting first became a member of the Berlin Artists Association, in 1899 he joined the Berlin Secession, but left it in 1901 with 16 other artists. He accused the Secession of not being open to all art movements. In 1902, he represented together with the older Bracht and Skarbina, Berlin in the annual exhibition of the Munich Glass Palace, following some exhibitions at art dealers the next years.

In 1904 he took part in the Louisiana Purchase Exposition, at the Great Berlin Art Exhibition in 1904 there was a special exhibition of Schlichting's works, later mostly a separate hall and in 1911 the gold medal as an award. In 1912 and 1916 to 1923 he was in charge of the Great Berlin Art Exhibition. In 1917 he was appointed professor. When the Lehrter Bahnhof was not available as an exhibition venue due to the war in 1917, Schlichting went to Fritz Roeber in Düsseldorf and the exhibition was still held as the “Great Berlin Art Exhibition in the Kunstpalast zu Düsseldorf”. In 1920 the Reichspost appointed him to a commission for the competition of postage stamps.

In the Berlin Artists' Association he held the office of chairman from 1919 to 1921, and then honorary chairman.

== Work ==
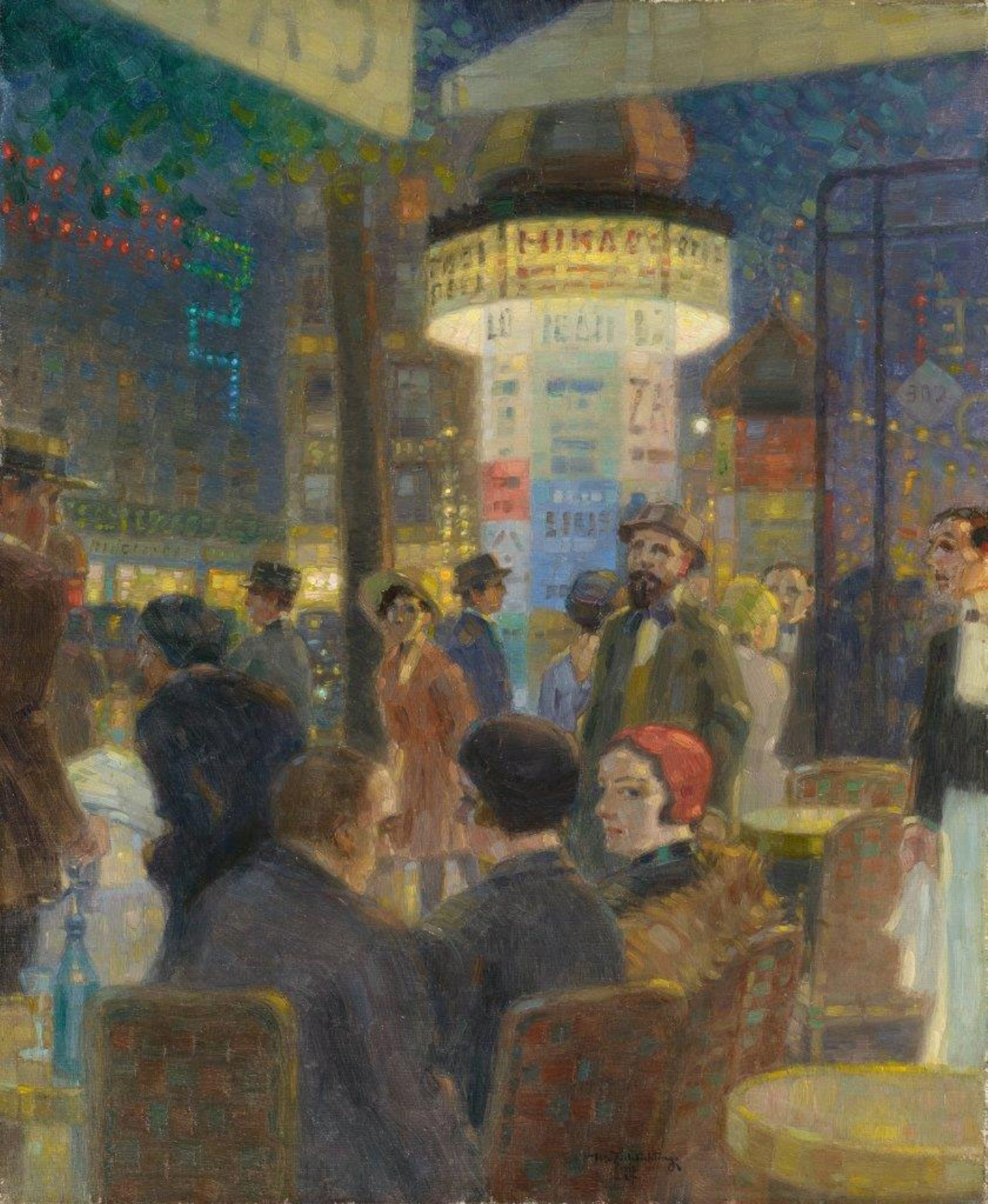
Max Schlichting: Boulevardcafe in Paris

Max Schlichting's work was considered undogmatic and fresh. As early as 1890, the bestselling author Richard Voss hired him as an illustrator of his books, but the collaboration was later ended for unknown reasons, and Voss took on other modern painters but Schlichting continued to illustrate for the New York Herald and The World.

The oldest dated painting is the a coast, which he painted when he was 19 years old in Belgium, most of the works show views of Paris and scenes from the surrounding area. One critic wrote that he was “sensitive” and would “... live in Berlin, but live in Paris.” Julius Elias also accused him as a “runaway Secessionist” of getting his suggestions from France, which was “not a play but a farce ”
