= August Kraus =

German sculptor

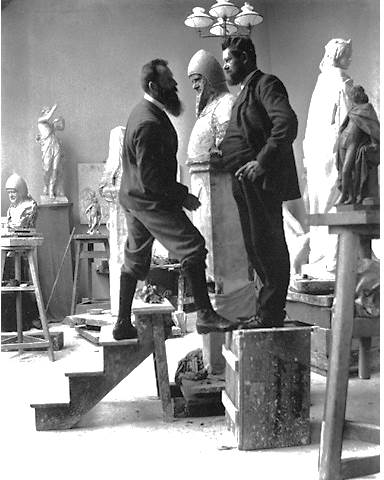
August Kraus (left) employing his friend Heinrich Zille as a model. (c.1900)

August Friedrich Johann Kraus (9 July 1868, Ruhrort - 8 February 1934, Berlin) was a German sculptor.

== Life ==
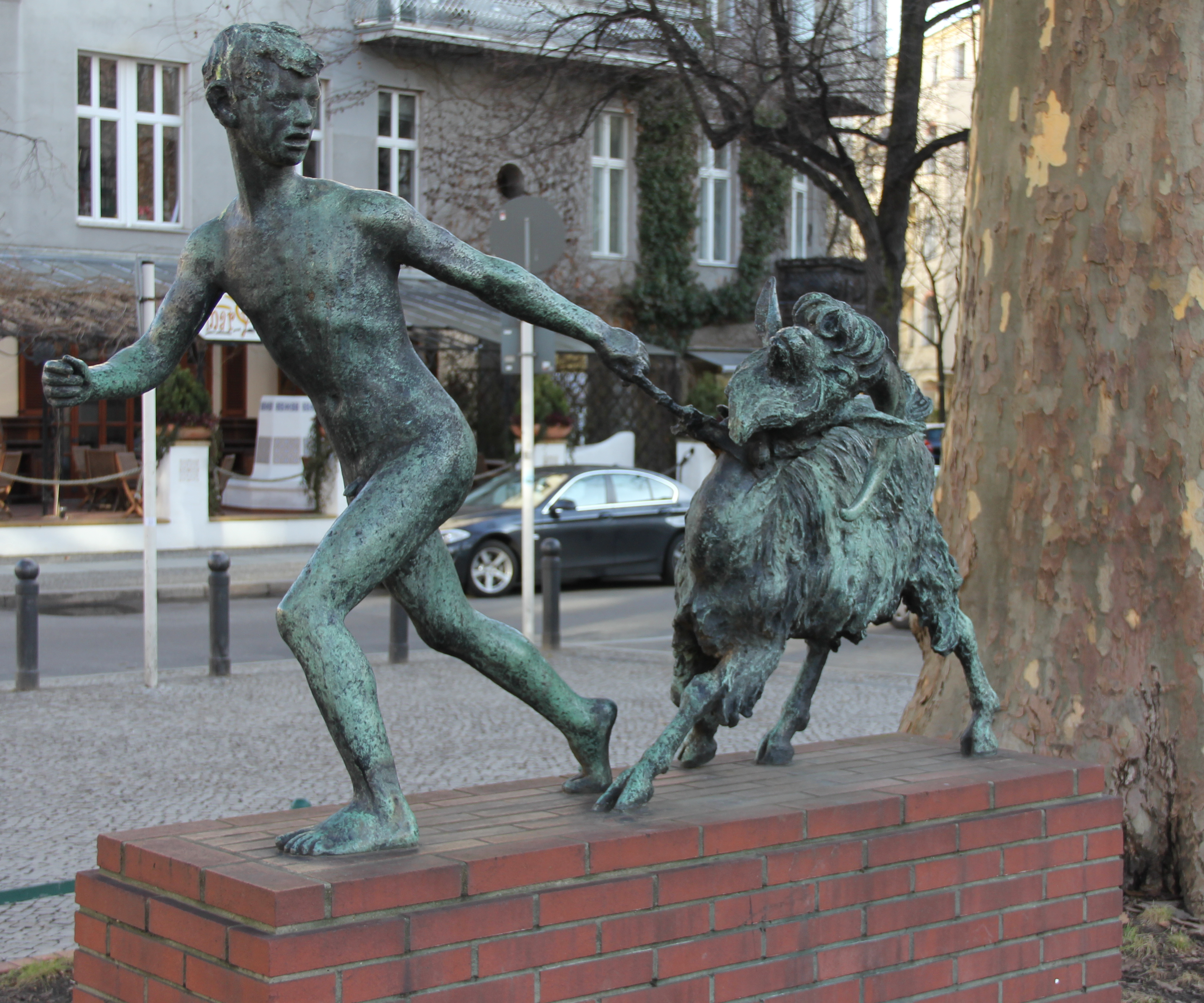
Boy with a Goat (1926-28)

He was the son of a coachman. In 1877, the family moved to Baden-Baden where he became an apprentice to a headstone sculptor. His family moved again in 1883, this time to Strasbourg, and he continued his studies at the municipal Arts and Crafts School. From 1887 to 1891, he was enrolled at the Prussian Academy of Art in Berlin, where he studied with Ernst Herter. For the next seven years, he was a Master Student of Reinhold Begas and continued to work under his influence for some time after.

In 1900. his work on the Siegesallee (Victory Avenue) project won him the Academy's "Staatspreis", which included a stipendium for five years of study in Rome. This enabled him to break away from his artistic and financial dependence on Begas. Once there, his style took a turn towards Neoclassicism. Upon his return, he became a member of the Berlin Secession and served as its vice-president from 1911 to 1913. He was Director of the Rauch-Museum from 1914 to 1920. The Sculptors' Association of Berlin elected him its first President. His work was part of the sculpture event in the art competition at the 1928 Summer Olympics.

After the Nazi Machtergreifung in 1933, he signed a Declaration of Loyalty to Hitler and became a member of the Presidential Council of the Reichskulturkammer. That same year, he was appointed chairman of the Department of Fine Arts in a newly "cleansed" Academy and served as Provisional President until his death. It has been reported that he died at the exact moment his statue of Henry the Child in the Siegesallee was being damaged by a storm, but this is probably apocryphal. He is buried in the Friedhof Heerstraße, but also has an "honorary grave" in Berlin.

== Selected major works ==
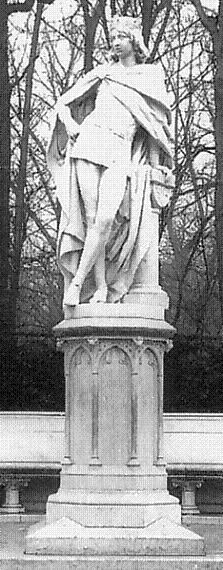
Henry the Child; from the Siegesallee (1900)

- 1898: Monument to the SMS Iltis, a gunboat which sank in a storm off the coast of Shandong; located along The Bund in the Shanghai International Settlement. It was destroyed near the end of the World War I.
- 1900-1901: Figures in the Siegesallee, Berlin. Kraus was the youngest sculptor to work on the project. He was closely assisted and supervised by Reinhold Begas and produced two sets of figures:

Group 9, consisting of Henry II, Margrave of Brandenburg-Stendal (also known as "Henry the Child") in the central position, flanked by side figures of Wartislaw IV, Duke of Pomerania and Wedigo von Plotho, a 14th Century knight, for which his friend Heinrich Zille was the model.
Group 32, with Wilhelm I as the central figure, flanked by Helmut von Moltke and Otto von Bismarck. There is some disagreement over the extent of Begas' contributions to this group.

- 1910: Statue of Heinrich Lanz, on the premises of Heinrich Lanz AG in Mannheim.
- 1926-28: "Knabe mit Ziege" (Boy with a Goat), in the Savignyplatz, Berlin.
- 1928: "Gefallenen-Denkmal" (Memorial to the Fallen), in the Hohenzollernpark in Anklam.
- 1929: The tomb of Heinrich Zille, Südwestkirchhof Stahnsdorf.
