= Käthe Kruse =

German dollmaker (1883–1968)

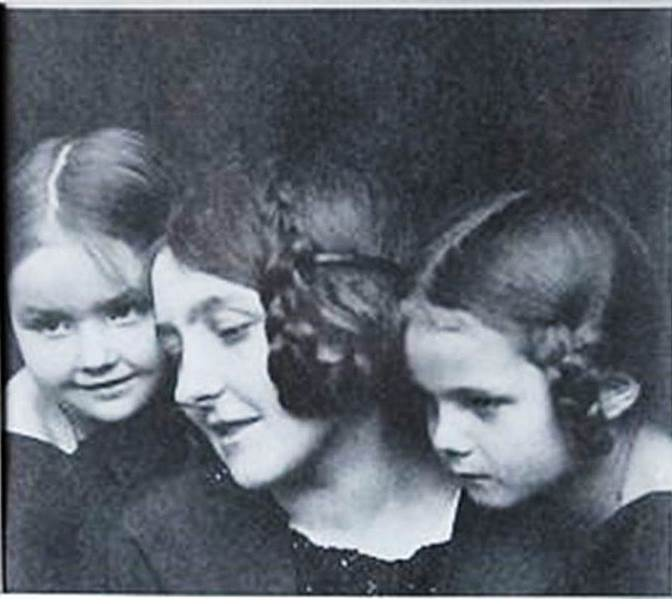
Käthe Kruse with her daughters Mimerle and Fifi

Käthe Kruse, born Katharina Simon (17 September 1883, in Dambrau – 19 July 1968, in Murnau am Staffelsee) was a notable pioneer of German doll-making and went on to establish manufacturing principles which persist to this day. Her original dolls remain very collectible due to their realism and durability, and fetch high prices from collectors.

== Life ==
She was the love child of Breslau's Chief Accountant, Robert Rogaske, and seamstress Christiane Simon and grew up in very modest circumstances, even though her father did continue to visit and provide some support. After graduating from the public schools, she took acting classes and obtained a position at Berlin's Lessing Theater in 1900. She was also quite successful in other German cities and gave performances in Warsaw and Moscow as well under the stage name "Hedda Somin". In 1902, she met the sculptor and occasional set designer Max Kruse and became his mistress. Kruse had four children from a previous marriage, and went on to have eight children together. She began to make dolls for her own kids because Max Kruse thought the mass-manufactured ones were "hideous" and refused to buy them.

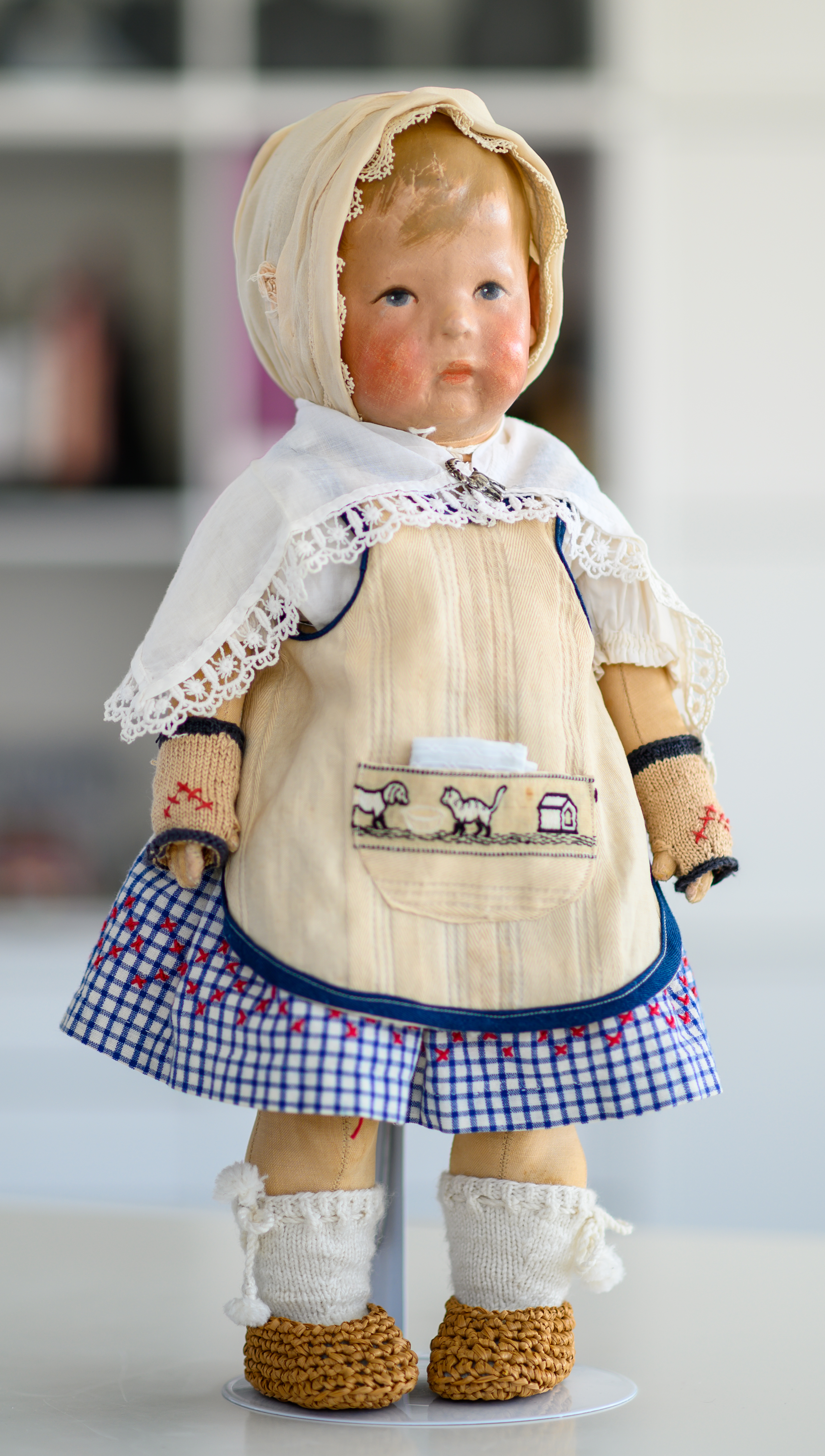
KK Doll No. 1 from 1918

By 1909, they had three daughters of their own and decided to get married. The following year, her dolls were first publicly displayed at the Warenhaus Tietz (a department store chain founded by Hermann Tietz). They proved to be popular, so she began taking individual orders. The dolls were very simple at first, but later became much more lifelike. As she perfected her production methods, she began to model the dolls after her own children. Their naturalness (in comparison with the commercial variety) soon made her famous.

== The hobby becomes a business ==
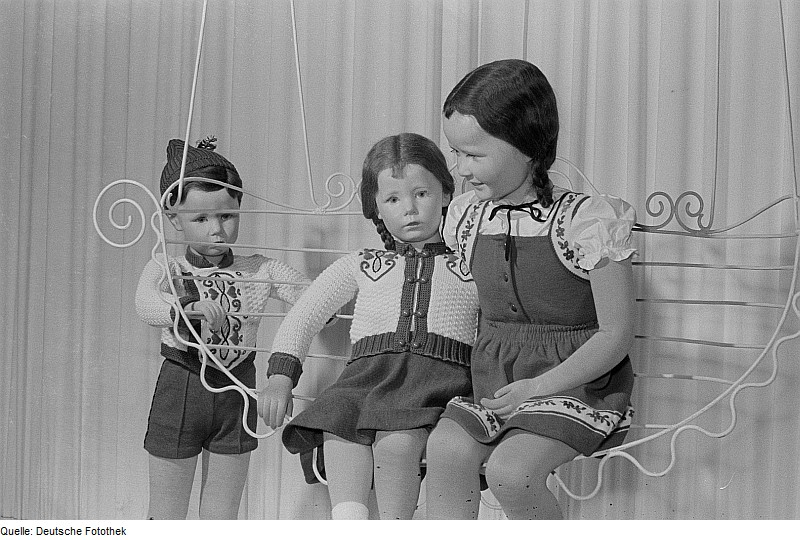
Three child mannequins designed by Käthe Kruse, 1954.

Two orders from the United States (the first for 150 dolls, the second for over 500) required her to establish a workshop with a large staff. In 1912, the family moved from Berlin to Bad Kösen, where the dolls continued to be handmade, despite the large number of orders. By 1925, counterfeit copies of her dolls were being made and she won her first copyright suit. Her company began to manufacture mannequins in 1934. Three years later she exhibited at the Paris Expo. Being generally uninterested in politics (except as it affected business), she placed her dolls together with figures of soldiers and welcomed Hjalmar Schacht to the German Pavilion. She also maintained contact with Jewish friends who had emigrated and refused to dismiss "Half-Jewish" employees.

During the war, it was difficult to get the necessary materials, so her business came to a standstill. Kruse's dolls took on a sorrowful countenance following the death of her son in battle, with the result that Adolf Hitler closed the factory and forbade her to make more dolls. She lost two of her sons in the war, and her husband died in 1942.

After the war, it was impossible to resume doll production in the Soviet occupation zone. In 1952, her company became a Volkseigener Betrieb ("Publicly Owned Corporation"). So, together with two of her sons (including the children's book author, Max, jr.), they started dollmaking workshops in Bad Pyrmont and Donauwörth and even managed to establish themselves in the Federal Republic. She still designed the dolls (and they were still handmade), but was not involved in production because of poor health. She spent her last years with her eldest daughter, Maria in Munich.

== The company in recent years ==
Today, the dolls at the Käthe Kruse Manufactory in Donauwörth are still made by hand. The bodies are either made with muslin and stuffed with reindeer hair, or have an inner wire skeleton covered with tricot knitting. The heads are made of fabric, papier maché or polystyrene and hand painted. Many have wigs knitted from real hair or mohair. Over the years, Käthe's daughter and successor, Hanne Adler-Kruse, introduced new items made of velour or terrycloth for babies.

In 1990, the company was sold to Andrea and Stephen Christenson, who maintained the company's traditions. In 2013, the firm was acquired by Hape Holding AG of Lucerne.

In Donauwörth, there is a Käthe-Kruse-Puppenmuseum. Permanent exhibitions may be found at the "Romanisches Haus" in Bad Kösen.
