= Max Kruse (author) =

German writer

- Born: 19 November 1921; Bad Kösen, Germany
- Died: 4 September 2015 (aged 93); Penzberg, Germany
- Occupation: Novelist
- Writing career
- Genres: Children's literature, Young adult fiction, Non-fiction

Max Kruse (19 November 1921 – 4 September 2015) was a German writer, mostly known for his children's books Der Löwe ist los (The Lion is on the loose) and Urmel aus dem Eis (Urmel from the Ice Age).

== Life ==
Max Kruse was born in 1921, the youngest of seven children of the sculptor Max Kruse and his wife Käthe Kruse, a well-known dollmaker. He briefly studied Philosophy and Business economics at the University of Jena until it was shut down due to the Second World War. After the war he worked as a freelance ad writer and later as an author.

Besides writing he was part of the advisory council of the Giordano Bruno Foundation.

He lived in Penzberg with his third wife.

Probably his most famous work is Urmel aus dem Eis. It is widely recognized and referenced in Germany, especially the TV-adaption by the Augsburger Puppenkiste and the Hessischer Rundfunk. Based on this novel there is computer-animated feature film Impy's Island.

== Works ==
=== Selected bibliography ===
Max Kruse wrote over 50 books which include the following works:

- Der Löwe ist los (1952)
- Kakadu in Nöten (1958)
- Sultan in der Klemme (1959)
- Ruhige Insel gesucht (1965)
- Windkinder (1968)
- Der kleine Mensch bei den 5 Mächtigen (1968)
- Urmel aus dem Eis (1969)
- Der Schattenbruder (1985)
- Die versunkene Zeit. Bilder einer Kindheit im Käthe-Kruse-Haus (Autobiography) (1991)
- Der Auserwählte (1995)
- Lord Schmetterhemd (2000)
- Die behütete Zeit. Eine Jugend im Käthe-Kruse-Haus. (Autobiography) (2000)
- Kerlchens wundersame Reise (2001)
- Die Froki Saga (2010)
- Im Wandel der Zeit – wie ich wurde, was ich bin. (Autobiography) (2011)

== Awards and nominations ==
- 1985 Der Schattenbruder was nominated for the Deutscher Jugendliteraturpreis (German Youth Literature Prize)
- 1993 Order of Merit of the Federal Republic of Germany
- 2000 Großer Preis der Deutschen Akademie für Kinder- und Jugendliteratur e.V. Volkach (Great Prize of the German Academy for Children's and Youth Literature)
- 2013 Bavarian Order of Merit
