= Franz Heckendorf =

German painter

- Born: 5 November 1888; Schöneberg, German Empire
- Died: 17 August 1962 (aged 73); Munich, West Germany
- Occupation: Painter

Franz Heckendorf (5 November 1888 – 17 August 1962) was a German expressionist painter closely associated with the Berlin Secession. He contributed works to the painting event in the art competition at the 1928 Summer Olympics. His work was highly regarded during the Weimar Republic but from 1937 was classed as entartete Kunst. During World War II, he was incarcerated in various prisons and eventually in Mauthausen concentration camp for helping Jews escape over the Swiss border.

== Sources ==
- Vollmer, Hans, ed. (1923). "Franz Heckendorf". Allgemeines Lexikon der Bildenden Künstler von der Antike bis zur Gegenwart. Begründet von Ulrich Thieme und Felix Becker. Vol. 16: Hansen–Heubach. Leipzig: E. A. Seemann. pp. 211–212.
- "Franz Heckendorf". In: Hans Vollmer (ed.): Allgemeines Lexikon der bildenden Künstler des XX. Jahrhunderts. Band 2: E–J. E. A. Seemann, Leipzig 1955, p.–400
- Alexandra Cacace: "Heckendorf, Franz". In: Allgemeines Künstlerlexikon. Die Bildenden Künstler aller Zeiten und Völker (AKL). Band 70, de Gruyter, Berlin 2011, ISBN 9783110231755, p. 513
- Horst Ludwig: "Franz Heckendorf". In: Bruckmanns Lexikon der Münchner Kunst. Münchner Maler im 19./20. Jahrhundert. Band 5: Achmann-Kursell. Bruckmann, München 1993, pp. 359–360
- Meyer, Winfried (2010). "NS-Justiz gegen Judenhelfer: „Vernichtung durch Arbeit" statt Todesstrafe. Das Urteil des Sondergerichts Freiburg i. Br. gegen den Berliner Maler Franz Heckendorf und seine Vollstreckung". In Wolfgang Benz (ed.). Jahrbuch für Antisemitismusforschung 19. Berlin: Metropol. pp. 331–362. ISBN 9783940938923.
- Symphonie in Farbe. Franz Heckendorf, Bruno Krauskopf. Wilhelm Kohlhoff. Katalog zur Ausstellung der Kunstfreunde Bergstraße 1991 in Bensheim-Auerbach. Mit einem Geleitwort von Rainer Zimmermann, Alsbach 1991
- Winfried Meyer: "Franz Heckendorf (1888–1962) – Maler, Bohemien und Fluchthelfer für Juden an der Schweizer Grenze". In: Angela Borgstedt et al. (eds.): Mut bewiesen. Widerstandsbiographien aus dem Südwesten (= Schriften zur politischen Landeskunde Baden-Württembergs, hrsg. von der Landeszentrale für politische Bildung Baden-Württemberg, Bd. 46), Stuttgart 2017, ISBN 9783945414378, pp. 217–228
