= Curt Herrmann =

German painter (1854–1929)

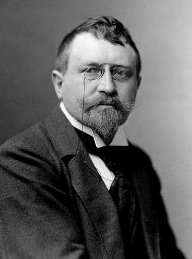
Herrmann c. 1900

Hugo Curt Herrmann (1 February 1854 – 13 September 1929) was a German Impressionist and Neo-Impressionist painter; associated with the Berlin Secession.

== Biography ==
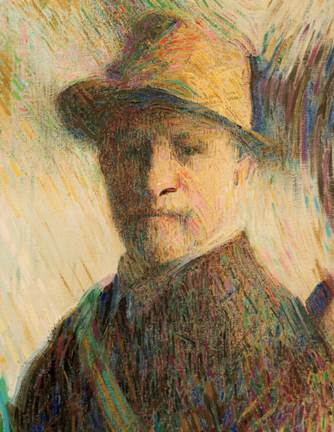
Self-portrait (1919)

He was born in Merseburg, in the Prussian Province of Saxony (now Saxony-Anhalt). His father was an insurance executive. When Hermann was sixteen, his family moved to Berlin. Three years later, he left school without graduating and found a position in the studios of Carl Steffeck. Although he was primarily interested in painting portraits, he also spent some time with the history painter Wilhelm von Lindenschmit at the Academy of Fine Arts, Munich. In 1885, he set up as a portrait painter in Munich and befriended the art critic Richard Muther.

In 1893, he moved to Berlin, where he opened a drawing and painting school for women. Four years later, he married Sophie Herz (1872–1931), one of his students. On his honeymoon in Paris, he met and befriended Henry van de Velde, who introduced him to Neo-Impressionism and later decorated his apartment in Berlin. In 1898, he became one of the founding members of the Berlin Secession and sat on its advisory board. He operated his school intermittently until 1903, when he joined the Deutscher Künstlerbund.

In Germany, he maintained contact with Paul Signac, Théo van Rysselberghe and Maurice Denis and, in 1902, was instrumental in convincing Paul Cassirer to display them at his gallery. Four years later, he organized an exhibition of modern French artists presented by the Secession. When the Secession split in 1914, he joined the new Free Secession and served as its president from then until 1918. He also worked to promote younger artists, such as Arthur Segal, Alexej von Jawlensky, Adolf Erbslöh and others associated with Die Brücke. He was named a Professor at the Royal Academy of Arts in 1917.

After the war, he abandoned Berlin and lived at a manor house in Pretzfeld that was owned by his mother-in-law. His work became increasingly abstract and, in 1923, he fell into a deep depression and gave up painting. The following year, at the request of art historian Richard Hamann, he was presented with an honorary doctorate by Marburg University. He made lengthy visits to a spa in Erlangen for treatment and died there in 1929.

In 1938, the Nazis razed the manor house and publicly burned one of his early paintings (A Boyish Act) on the grounds that it was immoral. By that time, his family had already fled to England.

== Selected paintings ==
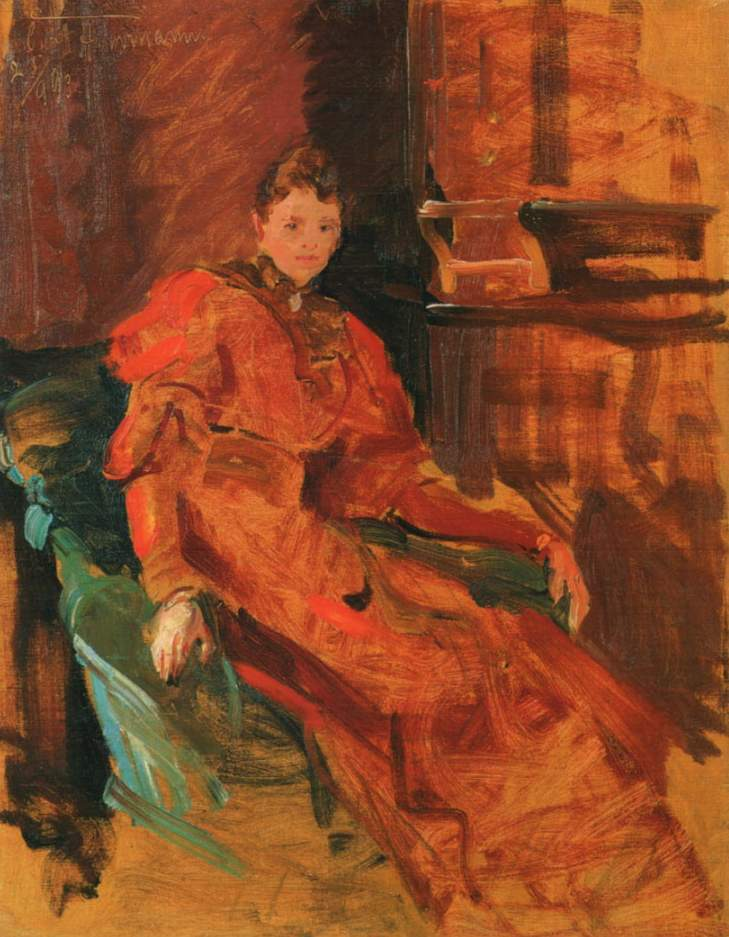
Lady in a Red Dress (1893)

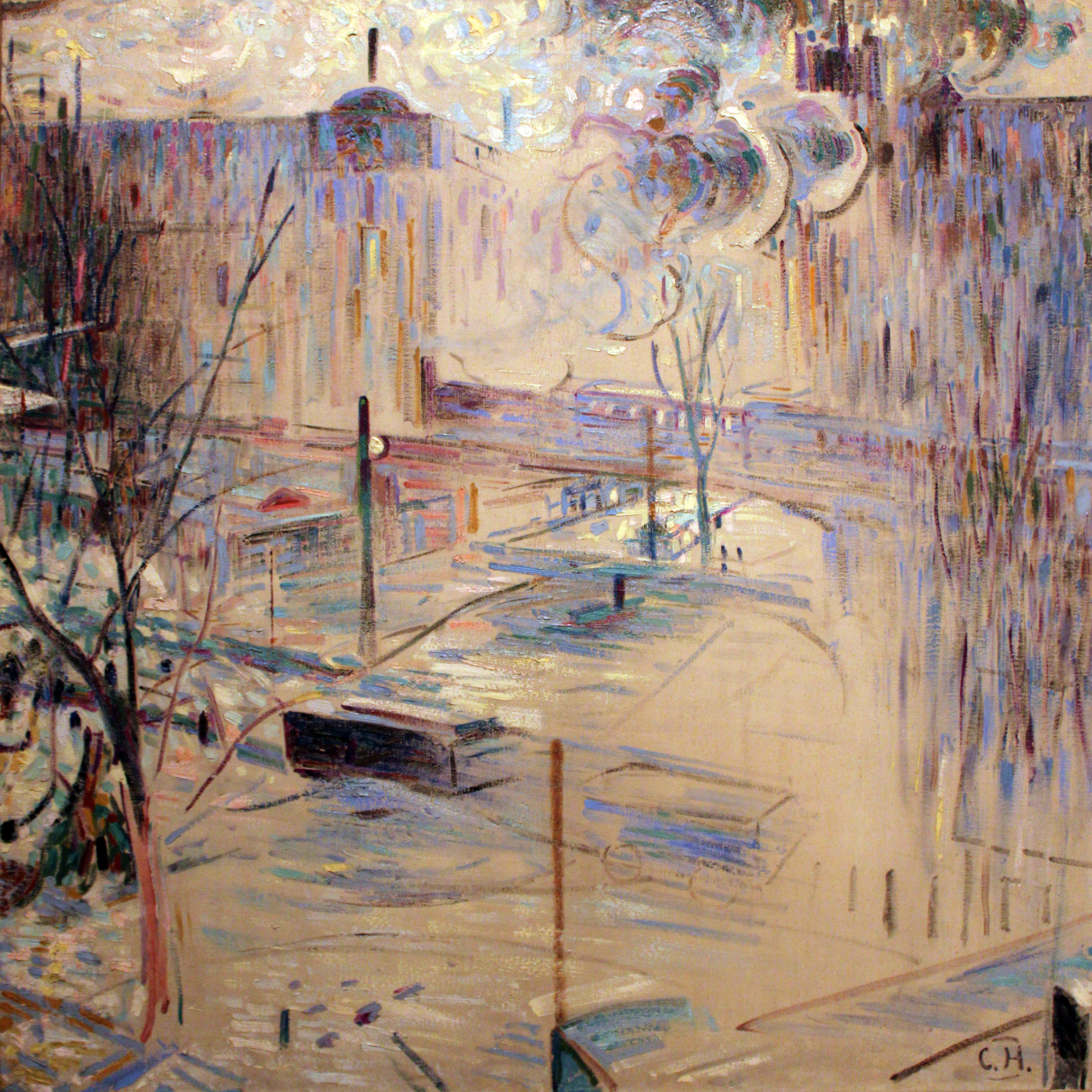
Savignyplatz (1911)

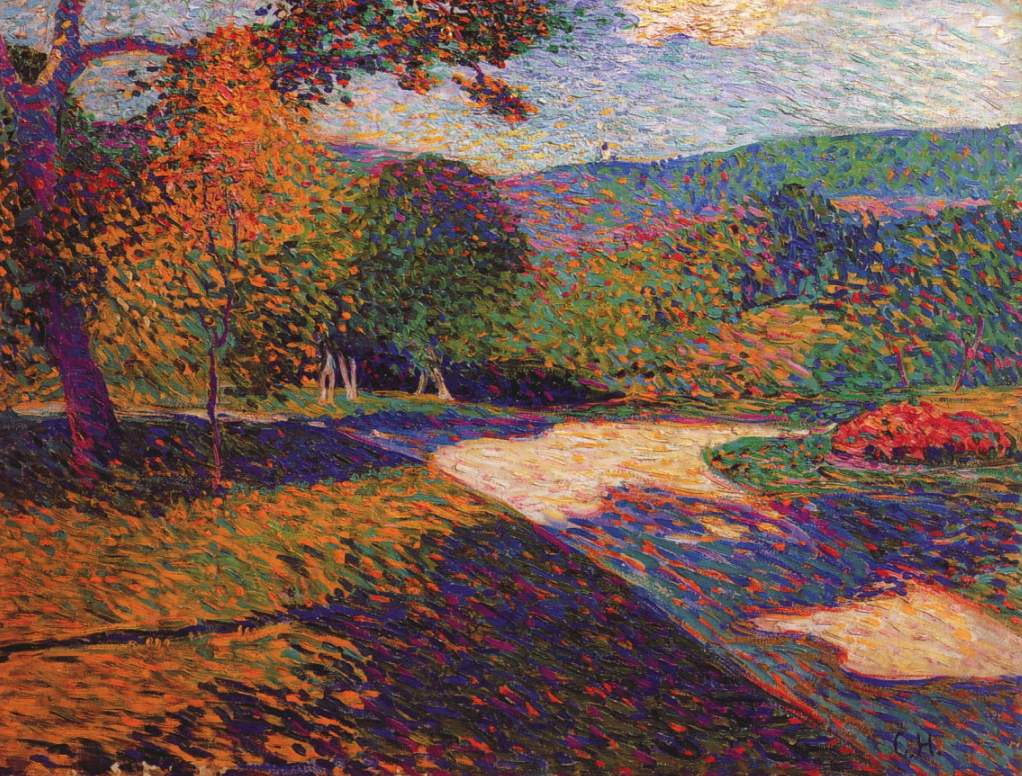
Park Path with View of Wiesenttal (ca. 1903)

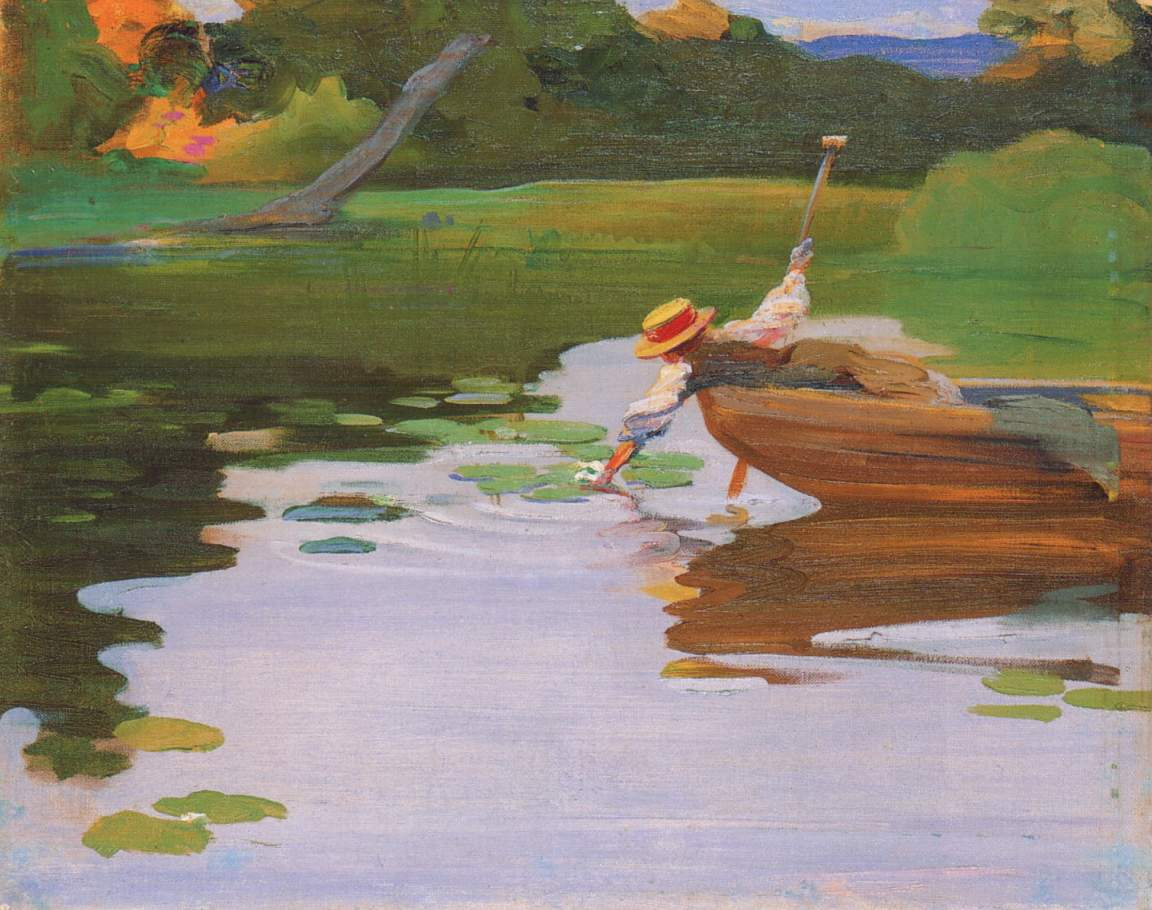
Lady in a Boat (1897–98)

== Sources ==
- Andrea Brandl (ed.), Curt Herrmann (1854–1929). Gemälde, Pastelle, Aquarelle. (exhibition catalog) Schweinfurt Municipal Collection/Marburg University Museum of Art, 2001, ISBN 3-927083-86-0.
- Thomas Föhl, Curt Herrmann. ein Künstlerleben 1854–1929. Ostfildern-Ruit 1996, ISBN 3-7757-0620-8.
- Rolf Bothe (ed.) Curt Herrmann. 1854–1929. Ein Maler der Moderne in Berlin. (exhibition catalog), Berlin-Museum, 1989, ISBN 3-922912-24-9.
