= Max Kruse (sculptor) =

German sculptor

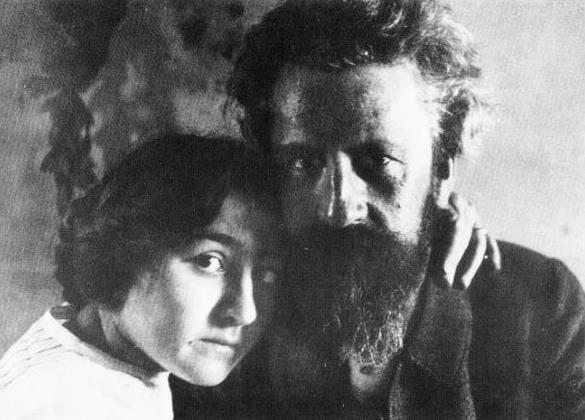
Max and Käthe Kruse (c. 1908)

Carl Max Kruse (14 April 1854, Berlin - 26 October 1942, Berlin) was a German sculptor and member of the Berlin Secession. His wife was the doll-maker and designer Käthe Kruse.

== Life ==
From 1874 to 1877, he attended the University of Stuttgart, majoring in architecture. He also studied art and entered the Prussian Academy of Arts, where his teachers were Fritz Schaper and Albert Wolff, completing his studies in 1879. His statue Siegerbote von Marathon (The Messenger from Marathon) brought him the "Prix-de-Rome" from the Prussian Academy of Arts, which included a stipendium that enabled him to make a study trip to Rome from 1881 to 1882.

He was also an inventor. His Verfahren zur Vervollkommnung von Lithopanien (Method for the Perfection of Lithophanes) and a Bildhauerkopiergerät (Sculpture Copier; apparently some sort of automated pointing machine) were patented in 1897. For Max Reinhardt, he designed one of the first Cycloramas from bits and pieces of plastic.

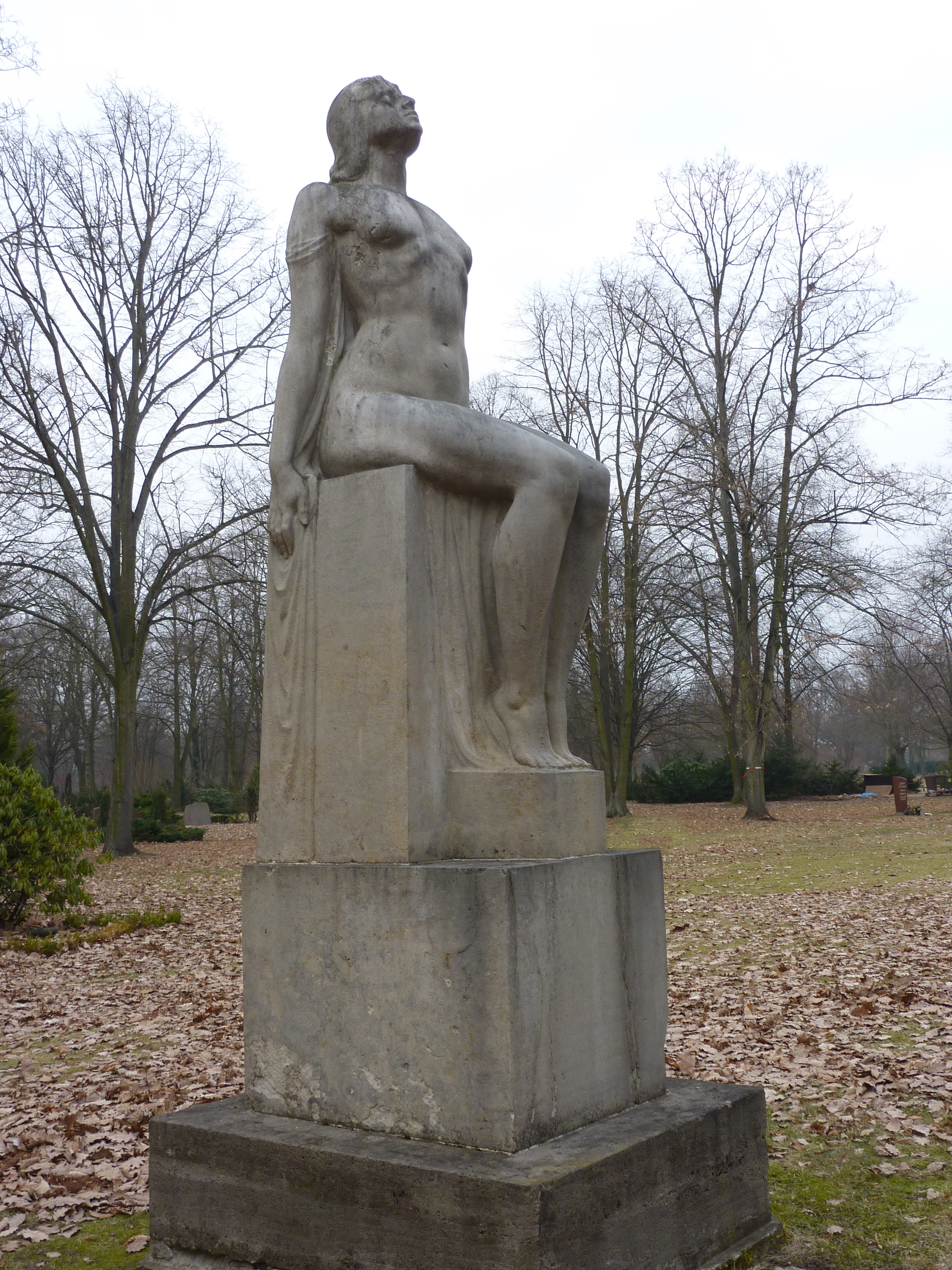
Persephone

In 1908, he joined the Berlin Secession. The following year, he married his mistress, Katharina (Käthe) Simon, who later became famous as a designer of dolls. They had seven children in addition to the four he had from a previous marriage. In 1913, he became a member of the Prussian Academy. He wrote a short book describing his sculptural techniques and proposing new ones in 1925. Although he made his headquarters in Berlin, he travelled extensively, spending time in the Monastery of Hiddensee and Bad Kösen.

His youngest son, also named Max, is an author of children's books. A daughter from his first marriage, Annemarie von Jakimow-Kruse, became a painter.

== Best-known works ==
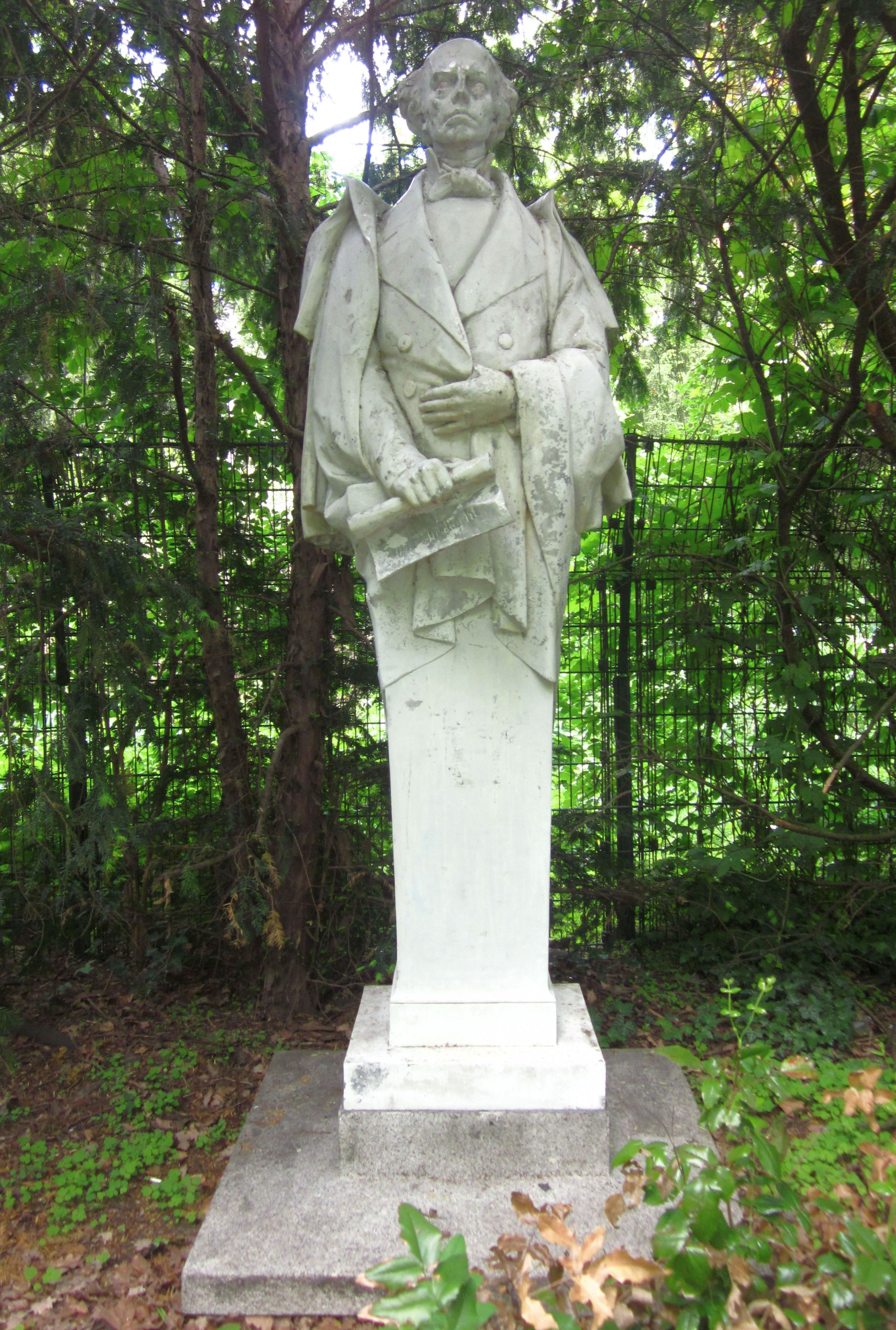
Herma of Ludwig Uhland

- The Siegesbote von Marathon, 1881, Original in the Alte Nationalgalerie. Copies may be found in the Theater des Westens, Krefeld and other places.
- Bust of Friedrich Nietzsche and herma of Ludwig Uhland for Viktoriapark, 1900. Today, the original Uhland is in the Leibniz-Oberschule, Berlin.
- Several figures on the front gable of the Theater des Westens.
- Figure of Persephone in the Parkfriedhof Neukölln, 1915
- Figure group Junge Liebe (Young Love), 1895/97
- Theodor Fontane Monument, 1907, Neuruppin

== Writings ==
- Ein Weg zu neuer Form (A Way to a New Form), which prefigures some trends in modern sculpture, notably the work of Henry Moore. Munich, G. W. Dietrich (1925)
