= Erich Büttner (painter) =

German painter

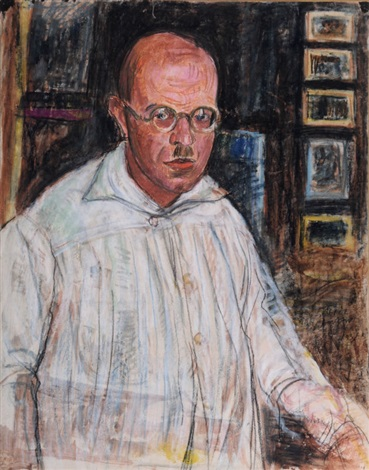
Self-portrait, 1931

Erich Büttner (7 October 1889 – 12 September 1936) was a German expressionist painter known for his vibrant contributions to early 20th-century art. He studied at the Unterrichtsanstalt des Kunstgewerbemuseums Berlin from 1906 to 1911 and, in 1908, became a member of the Berlin Secession.

== Works ==
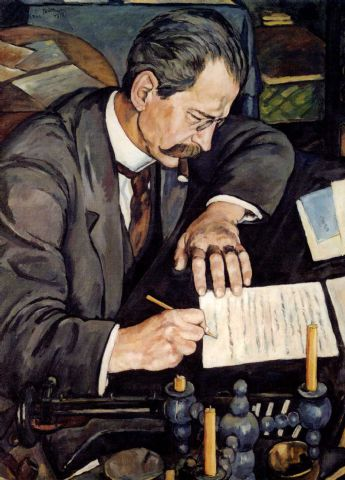
Portrait of Arno Holz, 1916

Büttner's work is characterised by its use of vibrant colour and the dynamic forms of expressionism. In the 1920s, he created a series of portraits of his friends and fellow artists, including Lovis Corinth, George Grosz, Arno Holz, and Heinrich Zille. In 1921, he produced a remarkable book of exlibris (bookplates) in Berlin. This rare publication includes the exlibris of Professor Dr. Albert Einstein from 1917, believed to be Einstein's only bookplate. Büttner's work was also featured in the art competitions at the 1928 Summer Olympics and 1932 Summer Olympics.

== See also ==
- List of German painters
