= Hermann Freese =

German painter

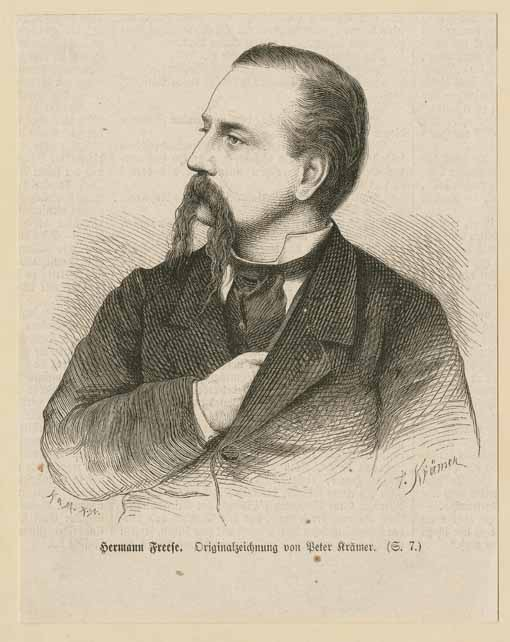
Portrait of Freese from 1870

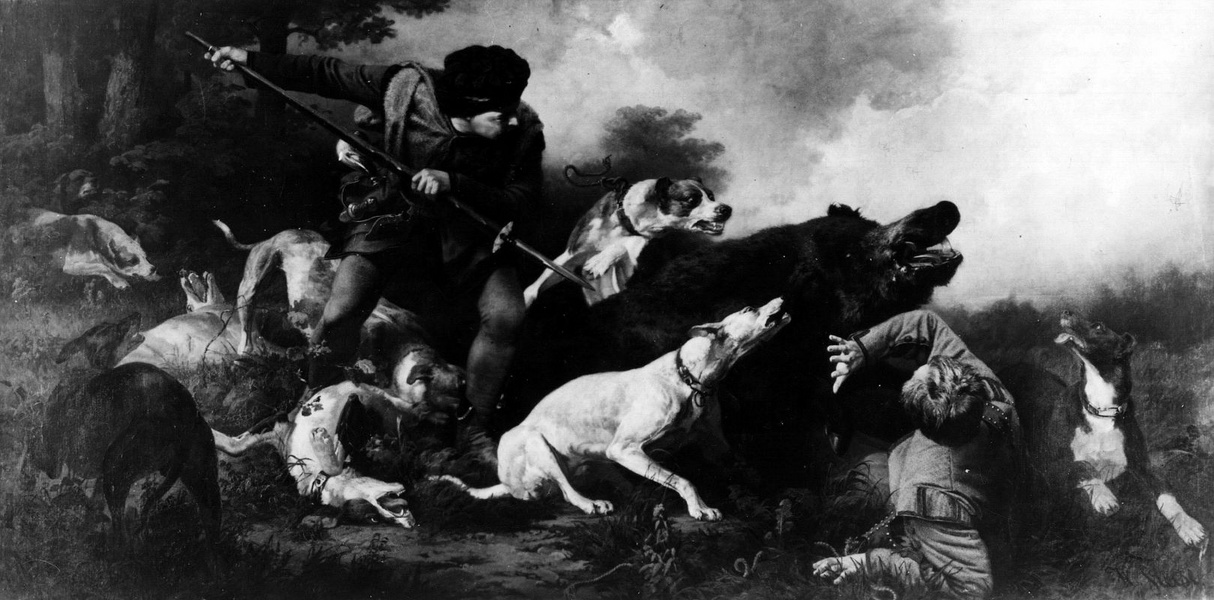
Hunting wild boars

Johann Oskar Hermann Freese was a Pomeranian artist. He emphasized animals and hunting scenes.

== Personal life ==
He was born in Pomerania in 1813. He was expected by his father to be a farmer, in spite of his early inclination to art. At age 34 he devoted himself to painting. He visited the studio of Wilhelm Brücke, then that of Carl Steffeck in Berlin.

== Art ==
In 1857 his first work, Stags Fighting, appeared. His subjects were principally hunting, which he loved passionately. Among his works are Deer Fleeing, Stags attacked by Wolves and a Boar Hunt, all in the Berlin National Gallery.

== Death ==
He died at Hessenfelde, near Fürstenwald, in 1871, of brain fever, which he contracted while trying to cross a river.

== See also ==
- List of German painters
