= Edema =

Accumulation of excess fluid in tissue

- Other names: Oedema, œdema, fluid retention, water retention, dropsy, hydropsy
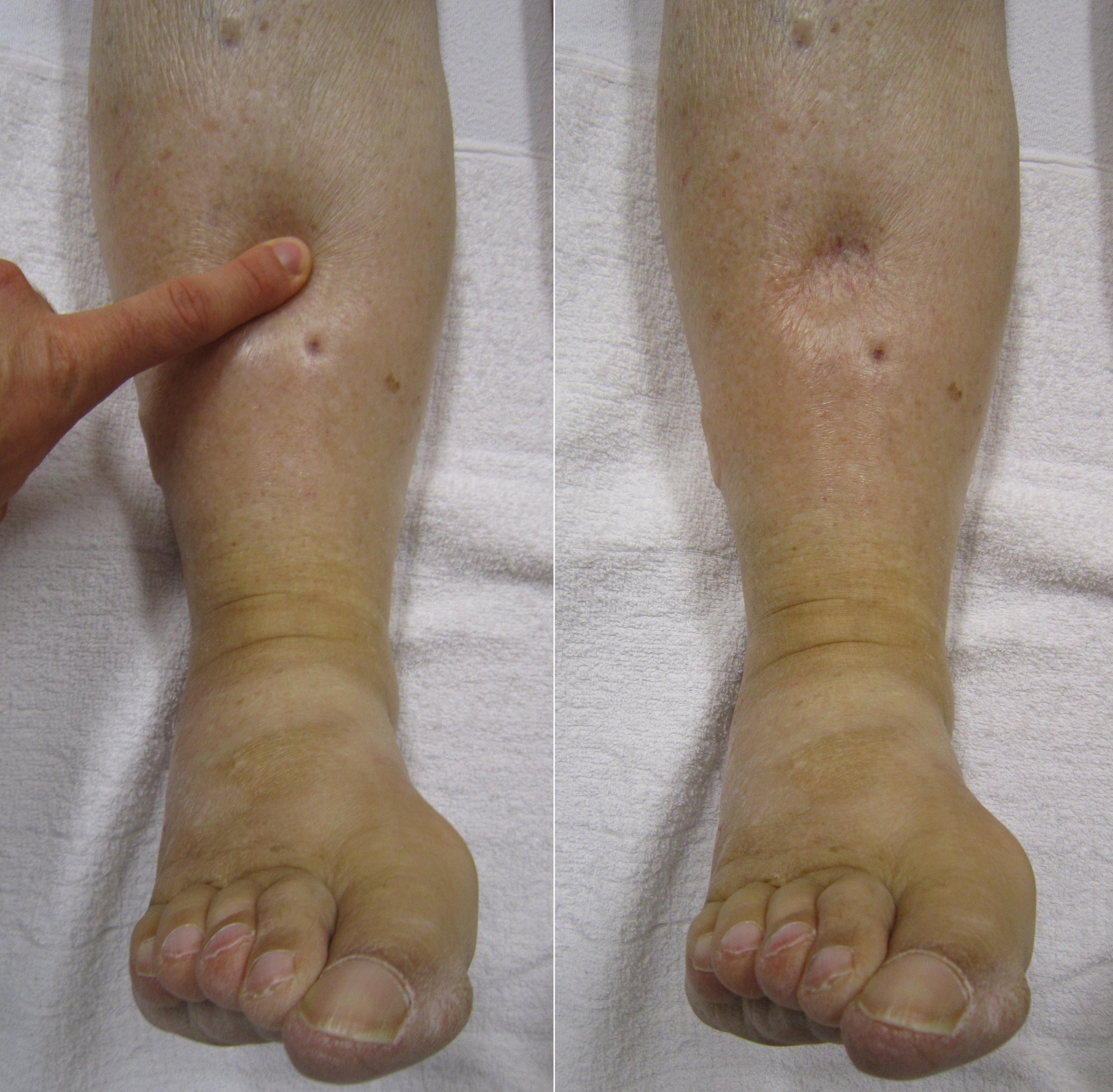
- "Pitting" edema
- Pronunciation: /ɪˈdiːmə/
- Specialty: Cardiology, nephrology
- Symptoms: Skin which feels tight, area may feel heavy
- Usual onset: Sudden or gradual
- Types: Generalized, localized
- Causes: Venous insufficiency, heart failure, kidney problems, low protein levels, liver problems, deep vein thrombosis, lymphedema
- Diagnostic method: Based on a physical exam
- Treatment: Based on cause

Edema (American English) or oedema (Commonwealth English), also known as dropsy, hydropsy, fluid retention, or simply swelling, is the buildup of fluid in a bodily tissue. Most commonly, the legs or arms are affected. Besides observable swelling, symptoms may include skin that feels tight, the area feeling heavy, and joint stiffness. Other symptoms depend on the underlying cause.

Causes may include venous insufficiency, heart failure, kidney problems, low protein levels, liver problems, deep vein thrombosis, infections, kwashiorkor, angioedema, certain medications, and lymphedema. It may also occur in people who are immobilized (as by stroke, spinal cord injury, or aging), even temporarily (as by prolonged sitting or standing), and during menstruation or pregnancy. The condition is more concerning if it starts suddenly, or if pain or shortness of breath is present.

Treatment depends on the underlying cause. If the underlying mechanism involves sodium retention, decreased salt intake and a diuretic may be used. Elevating the legs and support stockings may be useful for edema of the legs. Older people are more commonly affected. The word is from the Ancient Greek οἴδημα oídēma ('swelling').

== Signs and symptoms ==
=== Anatomical region ===
Edema may occur in various organs as a result of medical disorders, such as inflammation, tendinitis or blood clot in the leg, and during conditions like pregnancy (in legs). Certain organs develop edema through tissue specific mechanisms. Examples of edema in specific organs:

- Peripheral edema ("dependent" edema of legs) is extracellular fluid accumulation in the lower extremities caused by the effects of gravity, and occurs when fluid pools in the lower parts of the body, including the feet, legs, or hands. This often occurs in immobile people, such as paraplegics or quadriplegics, in pregnant women, or in otherwise healthy people due to hypervolemia or maintaining a standing or seated posture for an extended time. It can occur due to diminished venous return of blood to the heart due to congestive heart failure or pulmonary hypertension. It can also occur in people with increased hydrostatic venous pressure or decreased oncotic venous pressure due to obstruction of lymphatic or venous vessels draining the lower extremity. Certain drugs (for example, amlodipine) can cause edema of the feet.
- Cerebral edema is extracellular fluid accumulation in the brain. It can occur in toxic or abnormal metabolic states and conditions, such as systemic lupus or reduced oxygen at high altitudes. It causes drowsiness or loss of consciousness, leading to brain herniation and death.
- Pulmonary edema occurs when the pressure in blood vessels in the lung is raised because of obstruction to the removal of blood via the pulmonary veins.This is usually due to failure of the left ventricle of the heart. It can also occur in altitude sickness or after inhalation of toxic chemicals. Pulmonary edema produces shortness of breath. Pleural effusions may occur when fluid also accumulates in the pleural cavity.
- Edema may also be found in the cornea of the eye with glaucoma, severe conjunctivitis, keratitis, or after surgery. Affected people may perceive coloured haloes around bright lights.
- Edema surrounding the eyes is called periorbital edema (puffy eyes). The periorbital tissues are most noticeably swollen immediately after waking, perhaps as a result of the gravitational redistribution of fluid in the horizontal position.
- Common appearances of skin edema are observed with mosquito bites, spider bites, bee stings (wheal and flare), and skin contact with certain plants such as poison ivy or western poison oak, the latter of which are termed contact dermatitis.
- In lymphedema, abnormal removal of interstitial fluid is caused by failure of the lymphatic system. This is most commonly due to a failure of normal pumping action of muscles due to immobility, most strikingly in conditions such as multiple sclerosis or paraplegia. It may also be due to obstruction by a cancer or by enlarged lymph nodes. Destruction of lymph vessels or nodes by radiotherapy or from infiltration of the lymphatic system by infection may cause edema.
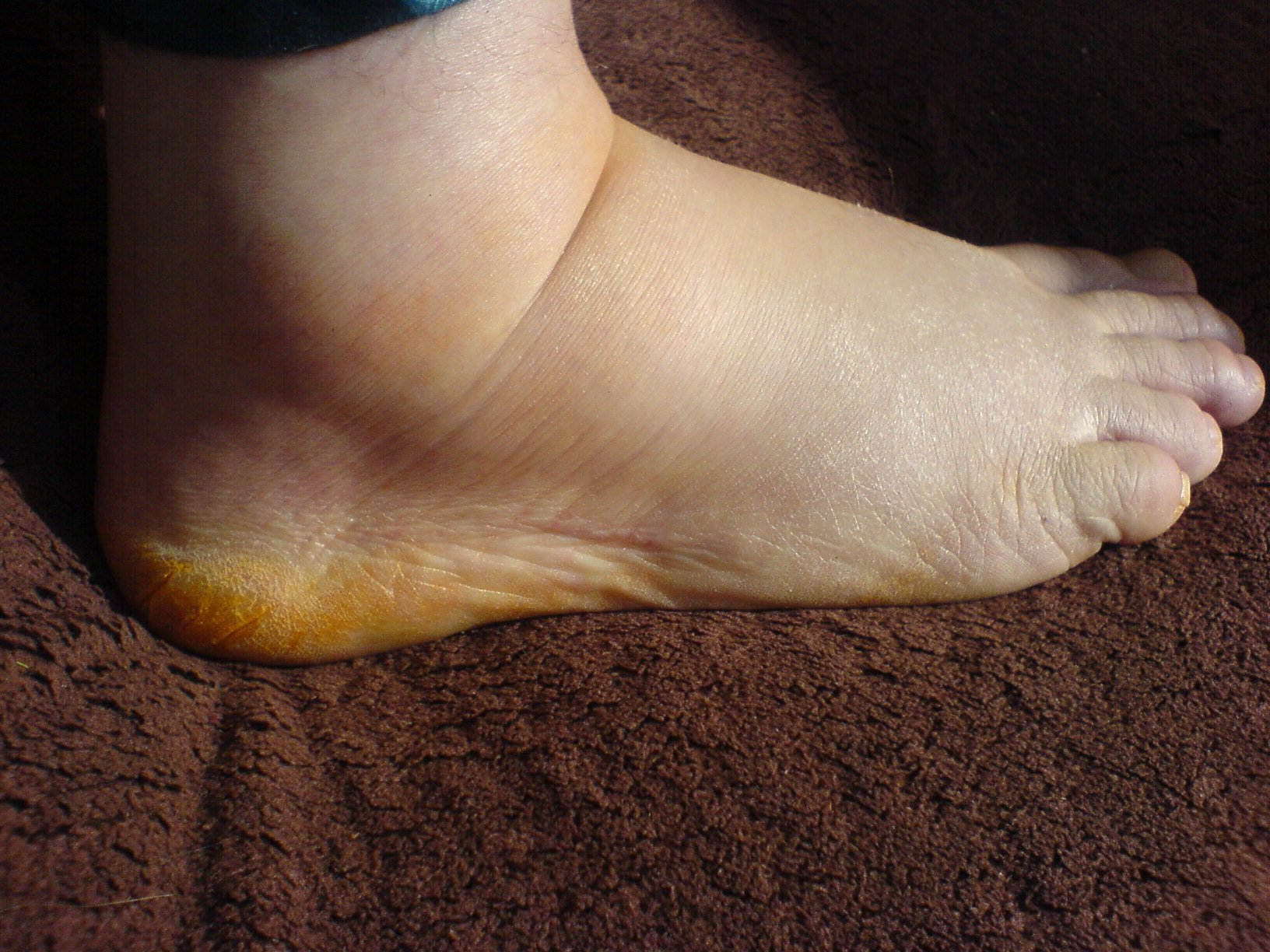
Foot two weeks post-surgery

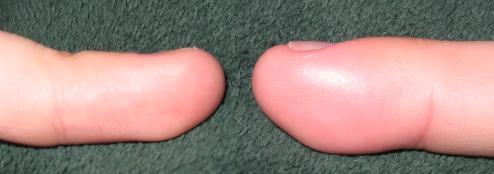
The distal phalanx of the right finger exhibits edema due to acute paronychia.

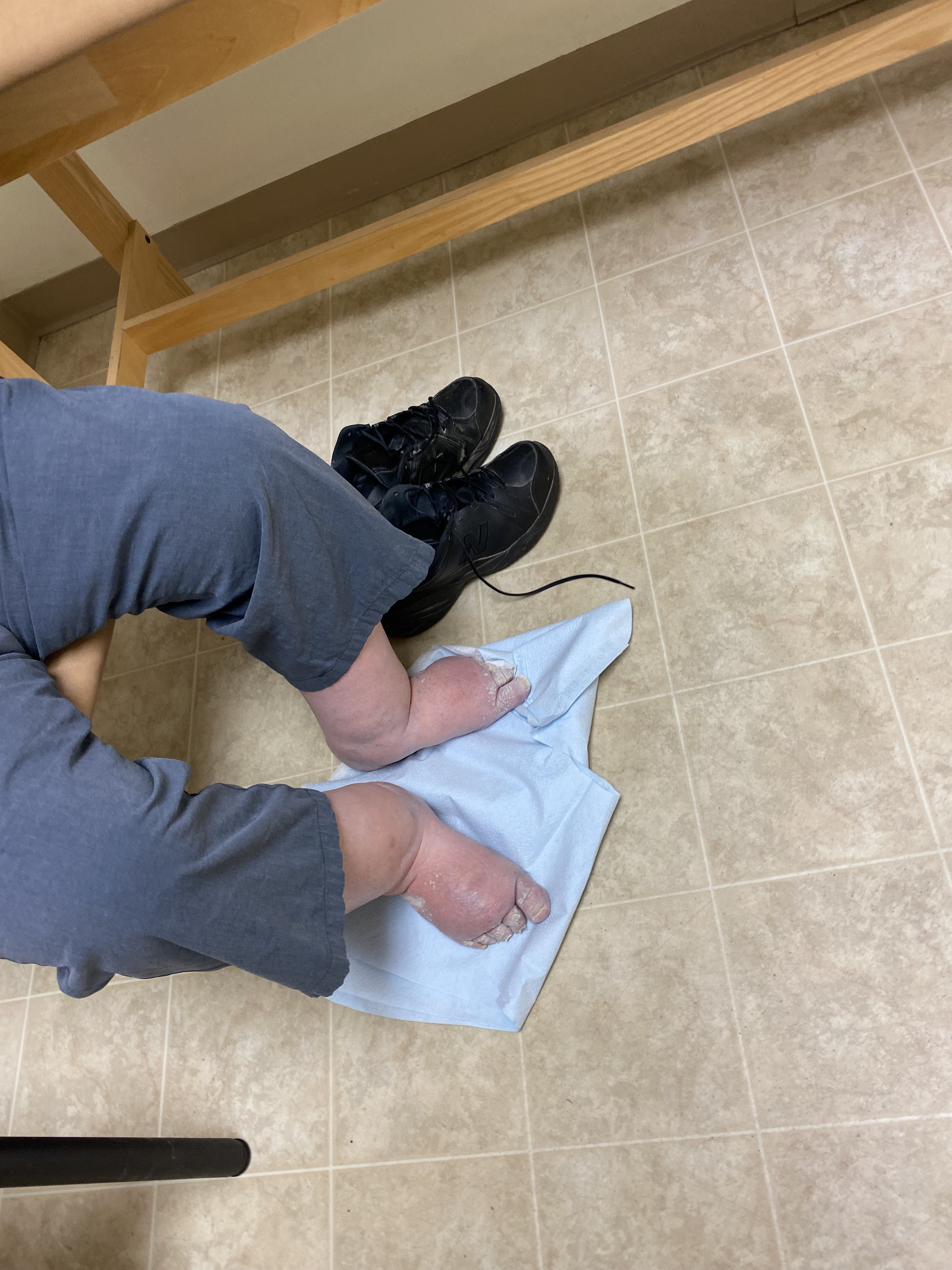
Severe edema in the legs and feet

=== Generalized ===
A rise in hydrostatic pressure occurs in cardiac failure. A fall in osmotic pressure occurs in nephrotic syndrome and liver failure.

Causes of edema that are generalized to the whole body can cause edema in multiple organs and peripherally. For example, severe heart failure can cause pulmonary edema, pleural effusions, ascites and peripheral edema. Such severe systemic edema is called anasarca. In rare cases, a parvovirus B19 infection may cause generalized edema.

Although a low plasma oncotic pressure is widely cited for the edema of nephrotic syndrome, most physicians note that the edema may occur before there is any significant protein in the urine (proteinuria) or fall in plasma protein level. Most forms of nephrotic syndrome are due to biochemical and structural changes in the basement membrane of capillaries in the kidney glomeruli, and these changes occur, if to a lesser degree, in the vessels of most other tissues of the body. Thus the resulting increase in permeability that leads to protein in the urine can explain the edema if all other vessels are more permeable as well.

As well as the previously mentioned conditions, edema often occurs during the late stages of pregnancy in some women. This is more common with those of a history of pulmonary problems or poor circulation also being intensified if arthritis is already present in that particular woman. Women who already have arthritic problems most often have to seek medical help for pain caused from over-reactive swelling. Edema that occurs during pregnancy are usually found in the lower part of the leg, usually from the calf down.

Hydrops fetalis is a condition in a baby characterized by an accumulation of fluid in at least two body compartments.

== Cause ==
=== Heart ===
The pumping force of the heart should help to keep a normal pressure within the blood vessels. If the heart begins to fail (a condition known as congestive heart failure), the pressure changes can cause very severe water retention. In this condition water retention is mostly visible in the legs, feet and ankles, but water also collects in the lungs, where it causes a chronic cough. This condition is usually treated with diuretics; otherwise, the water retention may cause breathing problems and additional stress on the heart.

=== Kidneys ===
Another cause of severe water retention is kidney failure, where the kidneys are no longer able to filter fluid out of the blood and turn it into urine. Kidney disease often starts with inflammation, for instance in the case of diseases such as nephrotic syndrome or lupus. This type of water retention is usually visible in the form of swollen legs and ankles.

=== Liver ===
Cirrhosis (scarring) of the liver is a common cause of edema in the legs and abdominal cavity.

=== Veins ===
Phlebetic lymphedema (or phlebolymphedema) is seen in untreated chronic venous insufficiency and is the most common type of edema (approx. 90%). It is a combination venous/lymphatic disorder that originates in defective "leaky" veins that allows the blood to back flow (venous reflux), slowing the return of the blood to the heart (venous stasis). The venous pressure in the legs changes dramatically while standing compared to lying down. How much pressure there is depends on the person's height; in the average adult person, it is 8 mm Hg while lying down and 100 mm Hg while standing.

In venous insufficiency, venous stasis results in abnormally high venous pressure (venous hypertension) and greater permeability of blood capillaries (capillary hyperpermeability), to drain the blood through the lymphatic system. The lymphatic system slowly removes excess fluid and proteins from the veins in the lower legs towards the upper body; however, as it is not as efficient as an unimpaired circulatory system, swelling (edema) is visible, particularly in the ankles and lower legs. The chronic increased fluid in the lymphatic system and capillary hyperpermeability causes an inflammatory response which leads to tissue fibrosis of both veins and lymphatic system, opening of arteriovenous shunts, all of which then worsens the condition in a vicious cycle.

=== Others ===
Swollen legs, feet and ankles are common in late pregnancy. The problem is partly caused by the weight of the uterus on the major veins of the pelvis. It usually clears up after delivery of the baby, and is mostly not a cause for concern, though it should always be reported to a doctor.

Lack of exercise is another common cause of water retention in the legs. Exercise helps the leg veins work against gravity to return blood to the heart. If blood travels too slowly and starts to pool in the leg veins, the pressure can force fluid out of the leg capillaries into the tissue spaces. The capillaries may break, leaving small blood marks under the skin. The veins themselves can become swollen, painful and distorted – a condition known as varicose veins.

Causes of bilateral pedal edema: (after exclusion of cardiac, renal, heart, liver and thyroid disorders, malnutrition or malabsorption).

- Drugs like calcium channel blockers, gabapentin, pregabalin, NSAIDs, steroids, anti-interleukin-6 inhibitors (e.g., tocilizumab).
- Chronic leg vein insufficiency (duplex ultrasound of leg veins – often noncontributory).
- Reduced mobility (geriatric patients/occupational/prolonged standing or sitting in same position)> reduced calf muscle activity>dependent edema/gravitational edema
- inferior vena cava obstruction and/or other causes of venous stasis
- Capillary leakage: acute endothelial dysfunction, sepsis, dengue, systemic capillary leakage syndrome, e.g., in monoclonal gammopathy of undetermined significance (associated with hypotension; 3rd space accumulation of fluid).
- Inflammatory edema: vasculitis/arthritis
- Vasomotor dysregulation like sympathetic denervation in diabetes, spinal cord injury, double hemiplegia, paraplegia, chronic stress related (sympathetic activity> vasoconstriction>venous stasis; increased cortisol).
- Heat edema – in patients returning from cold climates
- Early lymphatic dysfunction including obesity
- Other endocrine – Cushing/Conn/PMS estrogen elevation and RAAS activation; also a cause in pregnancy associated edema)
- Idiopathic cyclical edema (in females) Muscle action is needed not only to keep blood flowing through the veins but also to stimulate the lymphatic system to fulfill its "overflow" function. Long-haul airplane flights, lengthy bed-rest, or immobility caused by disability, are all potential causes of water retention. Even light exercises such as rotating ankles or wiggling toes can help to reduce peripheral edema.

Certain medications are prone to causing water retention. These include estrogens, thereby including drugs for hormone replacement therapy or the combined oral contraceptive pill, as well as non-steroidal anti-inflammatory drugs and beta-blockers.

Premenstrual water retention, causing bloating and breast tenderness, is common.

== Mechanism ==
Six factors can contribute to the formation of edema:

1. increased hydrostatic pressure;
2. reduced colloidal or oncotic pressure within blood vessels;
3. increased tissue colloidal or oncotic pressure;
4. increased blood vessel wall permeability (such as inflammation);
5. obstruction of fluid clearance in the lymphatic system;
6. changes in the water-retaining properties of the tissues themselves. Raised hydrostatic pressure often reflects retention of water and sodium by the kidneys.

Generation of interstitial fluid is regulated by the forces of the Starling equation. Hydrostatic pressure within blood vessels tends to cause water to filter out into the tissue. This leads to a difference in protein concentration between blood plasma and tissue. As a result, the colloidal or oncotic pressure of the higher level of protein in the plasma tends to draw water back into the blood vessels from the tissue. Starling's equation states that the rate of leakage of fluid is determined by the difference between the two forces and also by the permeability of the vessel wall to water, which determines the rate of flow for a given force imbalance. Most water leakage occurs in capillaries or post capillary venules, which have a semi-permeable membrane wall that allows water to pass more freely than protein. (The protein is said to be reflected and the efficiency of reflection is given by a reflection constant of up to 1.) If the gaps between the cells of the vessel wall open up then permeability to water is increased first, but as the gaps increase in size permeability to protein also increases with a fall in reflection coefficient.

Changes in the variables in Starling's equation can contribute to the formation of edemas either by an increase in hydrostatic pressure within the blood vessel, a decrease in the oncotic pressure within the blood vessel or an increase in vessel wall permeability. The latter has two effects. It allows water to flow more freely and it reduces the colloidal or oncotic pressure difference by allowing protein to leave the vessel more easily.

Another set of vessels known as the lymphatic system acts like an "overflow" and can return much excess fluid to the bloodstream. But even the lymphatic system can be overwhelmed, and if there is simply too much fluid, or if the lymphatic system is congested, then the fluid will remain in the tissues, causing swellings in legs, ankles, feet, abdomen or any other part of the body.

=== Capillary permeability ===
The excessive extracellular fluid (interstitial fluid) in edemas is to a substantial degree caused by an increased permeability of the smallest blood vessels (capillaries). This permeability is modulated by numerous biochemical chain reactions and can therefore be unbalanced by many influences.

Involved in these processes are, among others, the transmembrane proteins occludin, claudins, tight junction protein ZO-1, cadherins, catenins and actinin, which are directed by intracellular signal chains, in particular in connection with the enzyme protein kinase C.

== Diagnosis ==
Grading of edema
Grade	Definition
Absent	Absent
+	Mild: Both feet / ankles
++	Moderate: Both feet, plus lower legs, hands or lower arms
+++	Severe: Generalised bilateral pitting edema, including both feet, legs, arms and face

Edema may be described as pitting edema or non-pitting edema. Pitting edema is when, after pressure is applied to a small area, the indentation persists after the release of the pressure. Peripheral pitting edema, as shown in the illustration, is the more common type, resulting from water retention. It can be caused by systemic diseases, pregnancy in some women, either directly or as a result of heart failure, or local conditions such as varicose veins, thrombophlebitis, insect bites, and dermatitis.

Non-pitting edema is observed when the indentation does not persist. It is associated with such conditions as lymphedema, lipedema, and myxedema.

Edema caused by malnutrition defines kwashiorkor, an acute form of childhood protein-energy malnutrition characterized by edema, irritability, anorexia, ulcerating dermatoses, and an enlarged liver with fatty infiltrates.

== Treatment ==
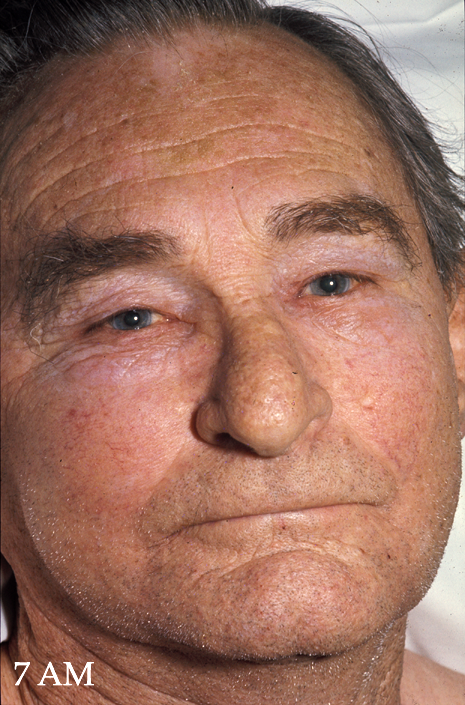
Vein obstruction causes facial edema while lying down to sleep.

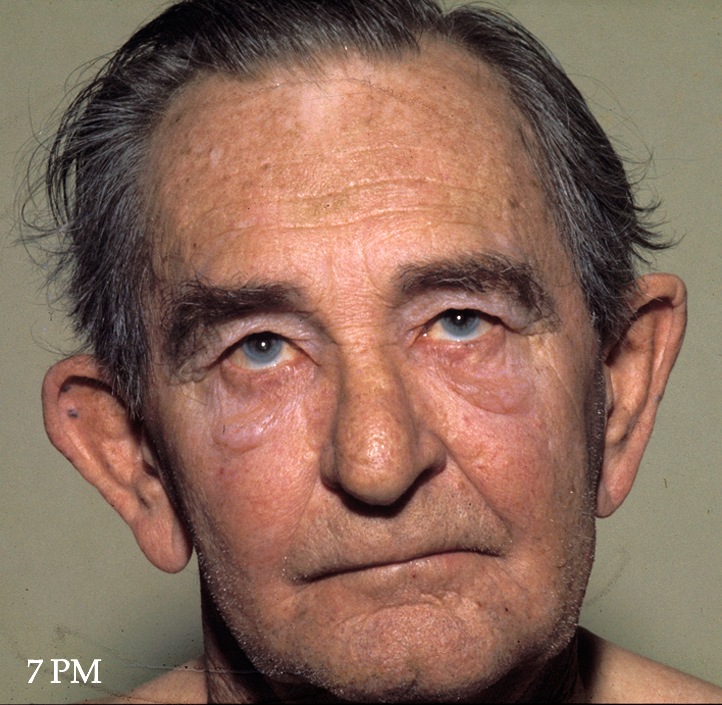
After being upright all day, the swelling disappears.

When possible, treatment involves resolving the underlying cause. Many cases of heart or kidney disease are treated with diuretics.

Treatment may also involve positioning the affected body parts to improve drainage. For example, swelling in feet or ankles may be reduced by having the person lie down in bed or sit with the feet propped up on cushions. Intermittent pneumatic compression can be used to pressurize tissue in a limb, forcing fluids — both blood and lymph — to flow out of the compressed area.
