= Klimsch =

Klimsch is a surname. Notable people with the surname include:

- Eugen Klimsch (1839–1896), German painter and illustrator
- Ferdinand Karl Klimsch (1812–1890), German painter and lithographer
- Fritz Klimsch (1870–1960), German sculptor
- Karl Klimsch (1867–1936), Germand painter and graphic artist
- Louis Klimsch (1852–1874), Germand painter
- Paul Klimsch (1868–1917), German Impressionist painter
