= Rudolf Virchow =

German doctor and polymath (1821–1902)

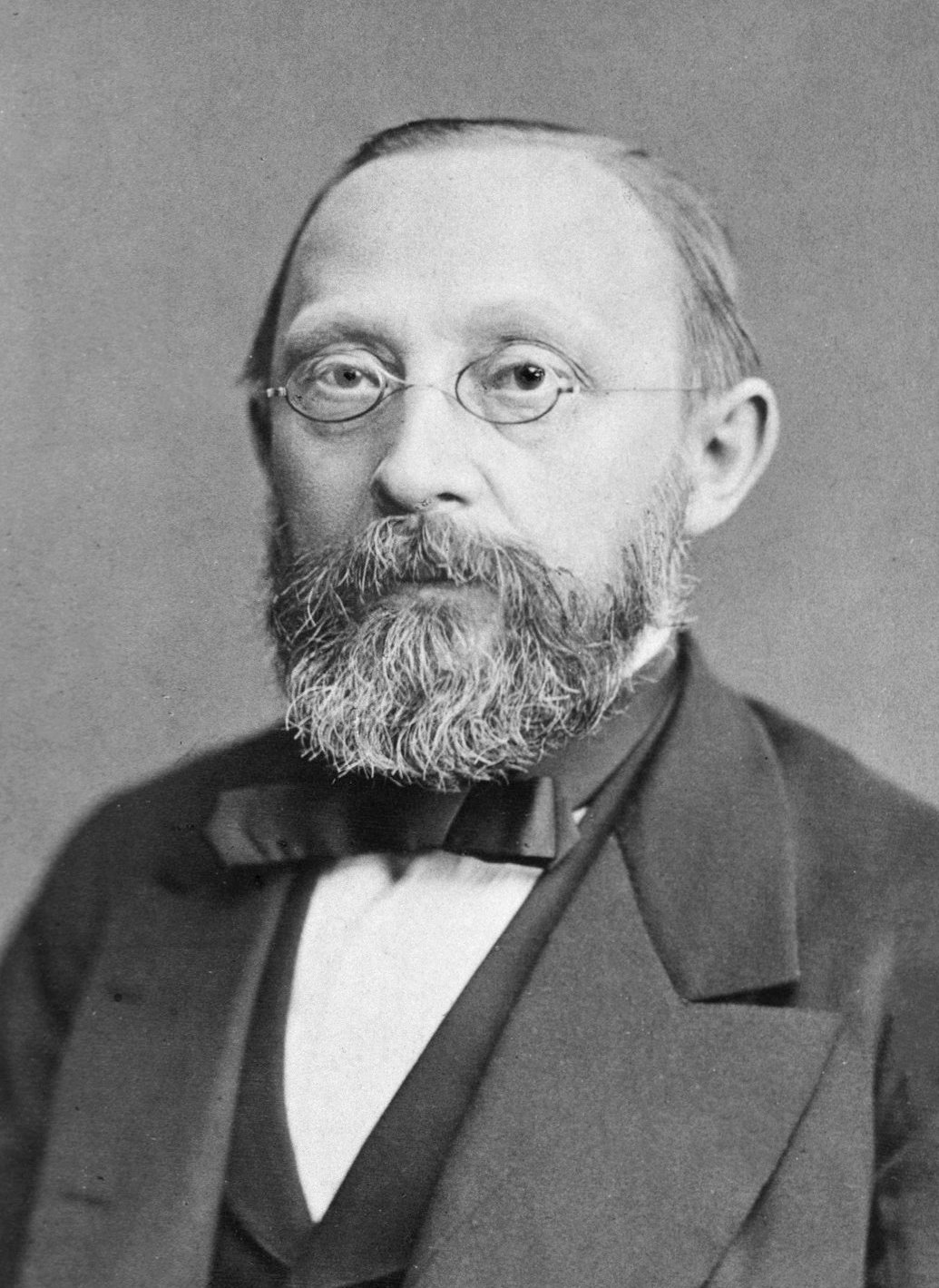
- Born: 13 October 1821; Schivelbein, Pomerania, Kingdom of Prussia
- Died: 5 September 1902 (aged 80); Berlin, Kingdom of Prussia, German Empire
- Resting place: Alter St.-Matthäus-Kirchhof, Schöneberg; 52.28°N 13.22°E
- Education: Friedrich Wilhelm University (M.D., 1843)
- Known for: Cell theory; Cellular pathology; Biogenesis; Virchow's triad
- Spouse: Ferdinande Rosalie Mayer (a.k.a. Rose Virchow)
- Awards: Copley Medal (1892)
- Scientific career
- Fields: Medicine; Anthropology
- Workplaces: Charité; University of Würzburg
- Thesis: De rheumate praesertim corneae (1843)
- Doctoral advisor: Johannes Peter Müller
- Other academic advisors: Robert Froriep
- Doctoral students: Friedrich Daniel von Recklinghausen; Walther Kruse
- Other notable students: Ernst Haeckel; Edwin Klebs; Franz Boas; Adolph Kussmaul; Max Westenhöfer; William Osler

Rudolf Ludwig Carl Virchow (/ˈvɪərkoʊ, ˈfɪərxoʊ/ VEER-koh, FEER-khoh; German: [ˈʁuːdɔlf ˈvɪʁço, - ˈfɪʁço]; 13 October 1821 – 5 September 1902) was a German physician, anthropologist, pathologist, prehistorian, biologist, writer, editor and politician. He is known as "the father of modern pathology" and as the founder of social medicine, and to his colleagues, the "Pope of medicine".

Virchow studied medicine at the Friedrich Wilhelm University under Johannes Peter Müller. While working at the Charité hospital, his investigation of the 1847–1848 typhus epidemic in Upper Silesia laid the foundation for public health in Germany, and paved the way for his political and social careers. From it, he coined a well known aphorism: "Medicine is a social science, and politics is nothing else but medicine on a large scale". His participation in the Revolution of 1848 led to his expulsion from Charité the next year. He then published a newspaper Die Medizinische Reform (The Medical Reform). He took the first Chair of Pathological Anatomy at the University of Würzburg in 1849. After seven years, in 1856, Charité reinstated him to its new Institute for Pathology. He co-founded the political party Deutsche Fortschrittspartei, and was elected to the Prussian House of Representatives and won a seat in the Reichstag. His opposition to Otto von Bismarck's financial policy resulted in a duel challenge by the latter. However, Virchow supported Bismarck in his anti-Catholic campaigns, which he named Kulturkampf ("culture struggle").

A prolific writer, he produced more than 2000 scientific writings. Cellular Pathology (1858), regarded as the root of modern pathology, introduced the third dictum in cell theory: Omnis cellula e cellula ("All cells come from cells"), although this concept is now widely recognized as being plagiarized from Robert Remak. He was a co-founder of Physikalisch-Medizinische Gesellschaft in 1849 and Deutsche Gesellschaft für Pathologie in 1897. He founded journals such as Archiv für Pathologische Anatomie und Physiologie und für Klinische Medicin (with Benno Reinhardt in 1847, later renamed Virchows Archiv), and Zeitschrift für Ethnologie (Journal of Ethnology). The latter is published by German Anthropological Association and the Berlin Society for Anthropology, Ethnology and Prehistory, the societies which he also founded.

Virchow was the first to describe and name diseases such as leukemia, chordoma, ochronosis, embolism and thrombosis. He coined biological terms such as "neuroglia", "agenesis", "parenchyma", "osteoid", "amyloid degeneration", and "spina bifida"; terms such as Virchow's node, Virchow–Robin spaces, Virchow–Seckel syndrome and Virchow's triad are named after him. His description of the life cycle of a roundworm Trichinella spiralis influenced the practice of meat inspection. He developed the first systematic method of autopsy, and introduced hair analysis in forensic investigation.

Opposing the germ theory of diseases, he rejected Ignaz Semmelweis's idea of disinfecting. He was critical of what he described as "Nordic mysticism" regarding the Aryan race. As an anti-Darwinist, he called Charles Darwin an "ignoramus" and his own student Ernst Haeckel a "fool". He described the original specimen of Neanderthal man as nothing but that of a deformed human.

== Early life ==
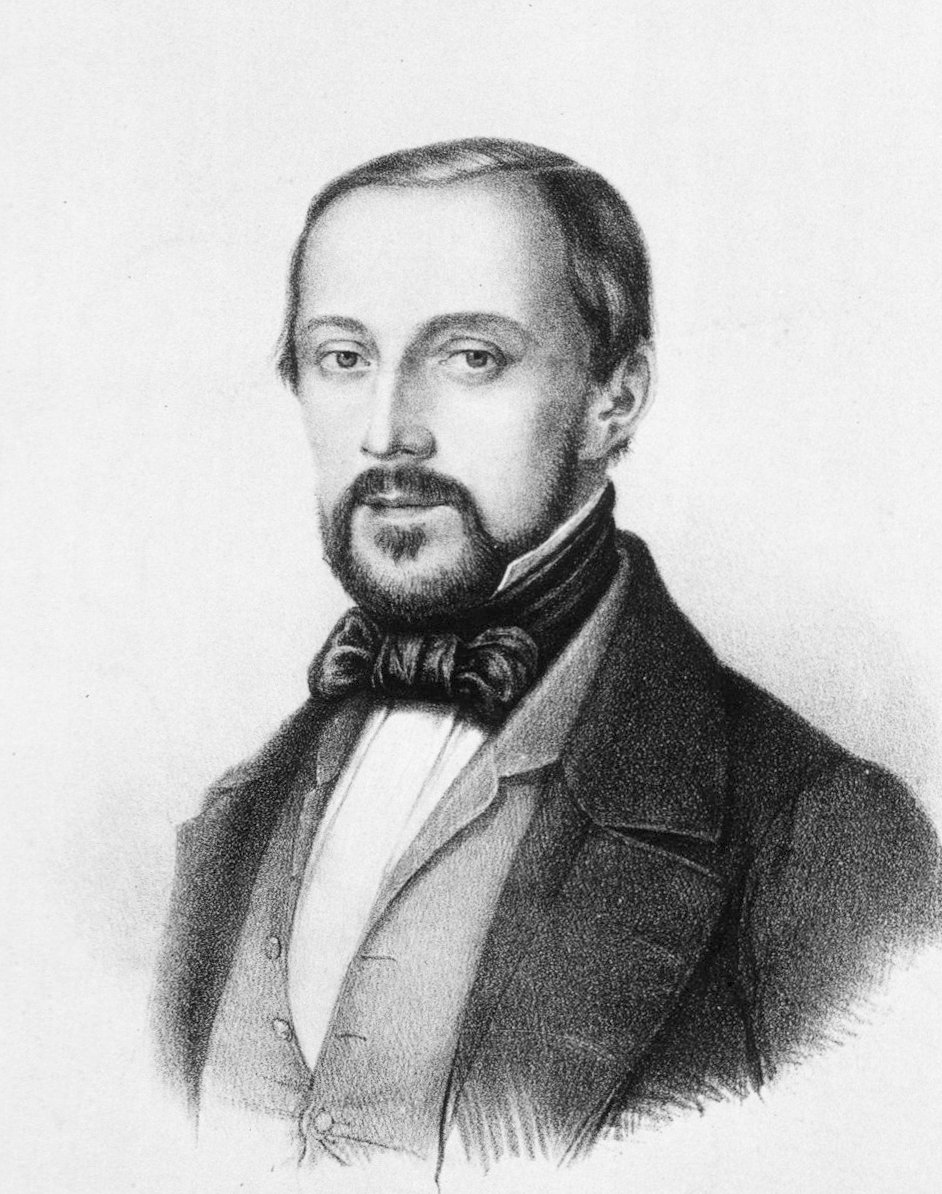
Young Virchow

Virchow was born in Schievelbein, in eastern Pomerania, Prussia (now Świdwin, Poland). He was the only child of Carl Christian Siegfried Virchow and Johanna Maria née Hesse. His father was a farmer and the city treasurer. Academically brilliant, he always topped his classes and was fluent in German, Latin, Greek, Hebrew, English, Arabic, French, Italian and Dutch. He progressed to the gymnasium in Köslin (now Koszalin in Poland) in 1835 with the goal of becoming a pastor. He graduated in 1839 with a thesis titled A Life Full of Work and Toil is not a Burden but a Benediction. However, he chose medicine mainly because he considered his voice too weak for preaching.

== Scientific career ==
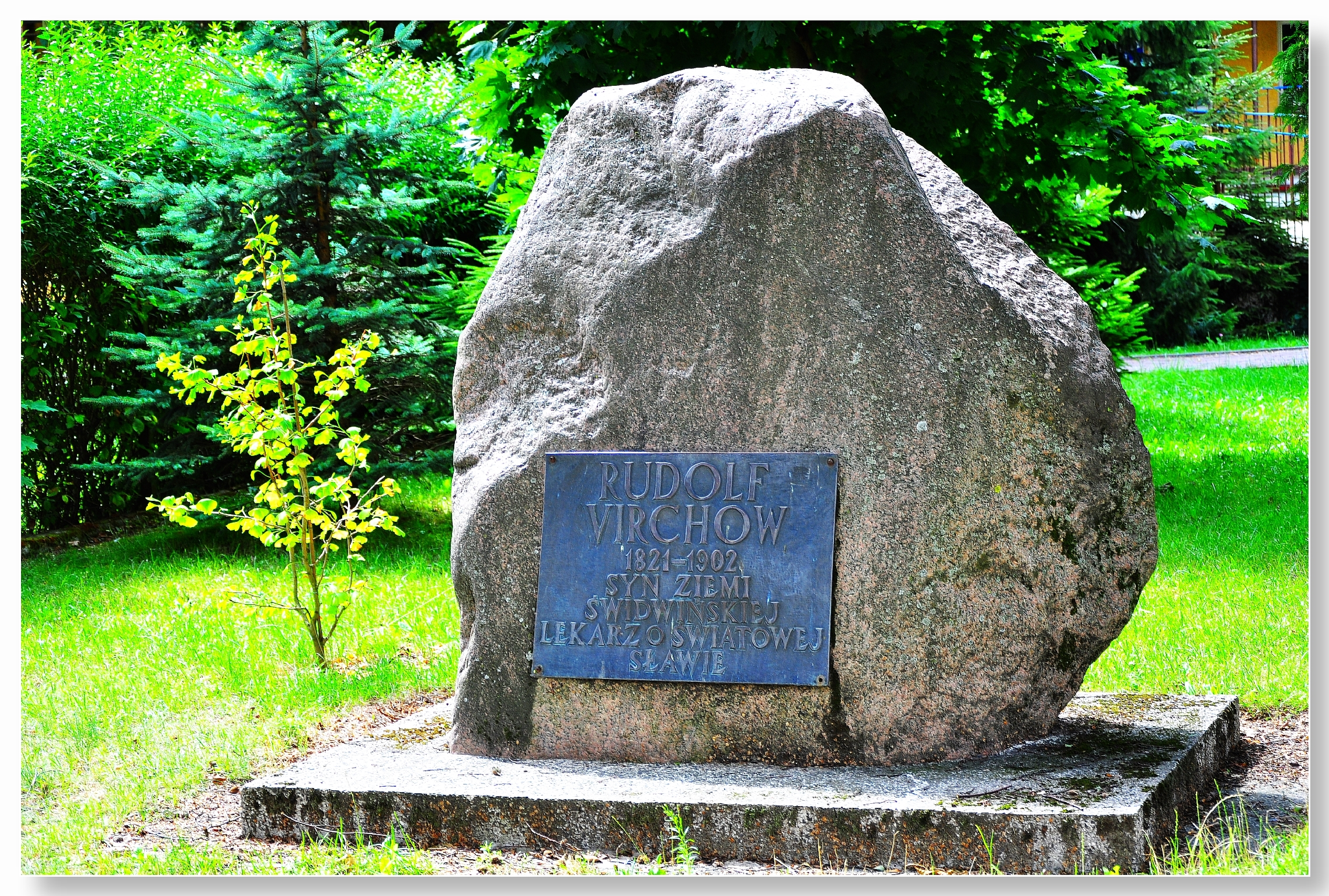
Memorial stone of Rudolf Virchow in his hometown Świdwin, now in Poland

In 1839, he received a military fellowship, a scholarship for gifted children from poor families to become army surgeons, to study medicine at the Friedrich Wilhelm University in Berlin (now Humboldt University of Berlin). He was most influenced by Johannes Peter Müller, his doctoral advisor. Virchow defended his doctoral thesis titled De rheumate praesertim corneae (corneal manifestations of rheumatic disease) on 21 October 1843. Immediately on graduation, he became subordinate physician to Müller. But shortly after, he joined the Charité Hospital in Berlin for internship. In 1844, he was appointed as medical assistant to the prosector (pathologist) Robert Froriep, from whom he learned microscopy which interested him in pathology. Froriep was also the editor of an abstract journal that specialised in foreign work, which inspired Virchow for scientific ideas of France and England.

Virchow published his first scientific paper in 1845, giving the earliest known pathological descriptions of leukemia. He passed the medical licensure examination in 1846 and immediately succeeded Froriep as hospital prosector at the Charité. In 1847, he was appointed to his first academic position with the rank of privatdozent. Because his articles did not receive favourable attention from German editors, he founded Archiv für Pathologische Anatomie und Physiologie und für Klinische Medicin (now known as Virchows Archiv) with his colleague Benno Reinhardt in 1847. He edited alone from Reinhardt's death in 1852 until his own. This journal published critical articles based on the criterion that no papers would be published that contained outdated, untested, dogmatic or speculative ideas.

Unlike his German peers, Virchow had great faith in clinical observation, animal experimentation (to determine causes of diseases and the effects of drugs) and pathological anatomy, particularly at the microscopic level, as the basic principles of investigation in medical sciences. He went further and stated that the cell was the basic unit of the body that had to be studied to understand disease. Although the term 'cell' had been coined in 1665 during the English scientist Robert Hooke's early application of the microscope to biology, the building blocks of life were still considered to be the 21 tissues of Bichat, a concept described by the French physician Xavier Bichat.

The Prussian government employed Virchow to study the typhus epidemic in Upper Silesia in 1847–1848. It was from this medical campaign that he developed his ideas on social medicine and politics after seeing the victims and their poverty. Even though he was not particularly successful in combating the epidemic, his 190-paged Report on the Typhus Epidemic in Upper Silesia in 1848 became a turning point in politics and public health in Germany. He returned to Berlin on 10 March 1848, and only eight days later, a revolution broke out against the government in which he played an active part. To fight political injustice he helped found Die Medizinische Reform (Medical Reform), a weekly newspaper for promoting social medicine, in July of that year. The newspaper ran under the banners "medicine is a social science" and "the physician is the natural attorney of the poor". Political pressures forced him to terminate the publication in June 1849, and he was expelled from his official position.

In November 1848, he was given an academic appointment and left Berlin for the University of Würzburg to hold Germany's first chair of pathological anatomy. During his seven-year period there, he concentrated on his scientific work, including detailed studies of venous thrombosis and cellular theory. His first major work there was a six-volume Handbuch der speciellen Pathologie und Therapie (Handbook on Special Pathology and Therapeutics) published in 1854. In 1856, he returned to Berlin to become the newly created Chair for Pathological Anatomy and Physiology at the Friedrich-Wilhelms-University, as well as Director of the newly built Institute for Pathology on the premises of the Charité. He held the latter post for the next 20 years.

=== Cell biology ===
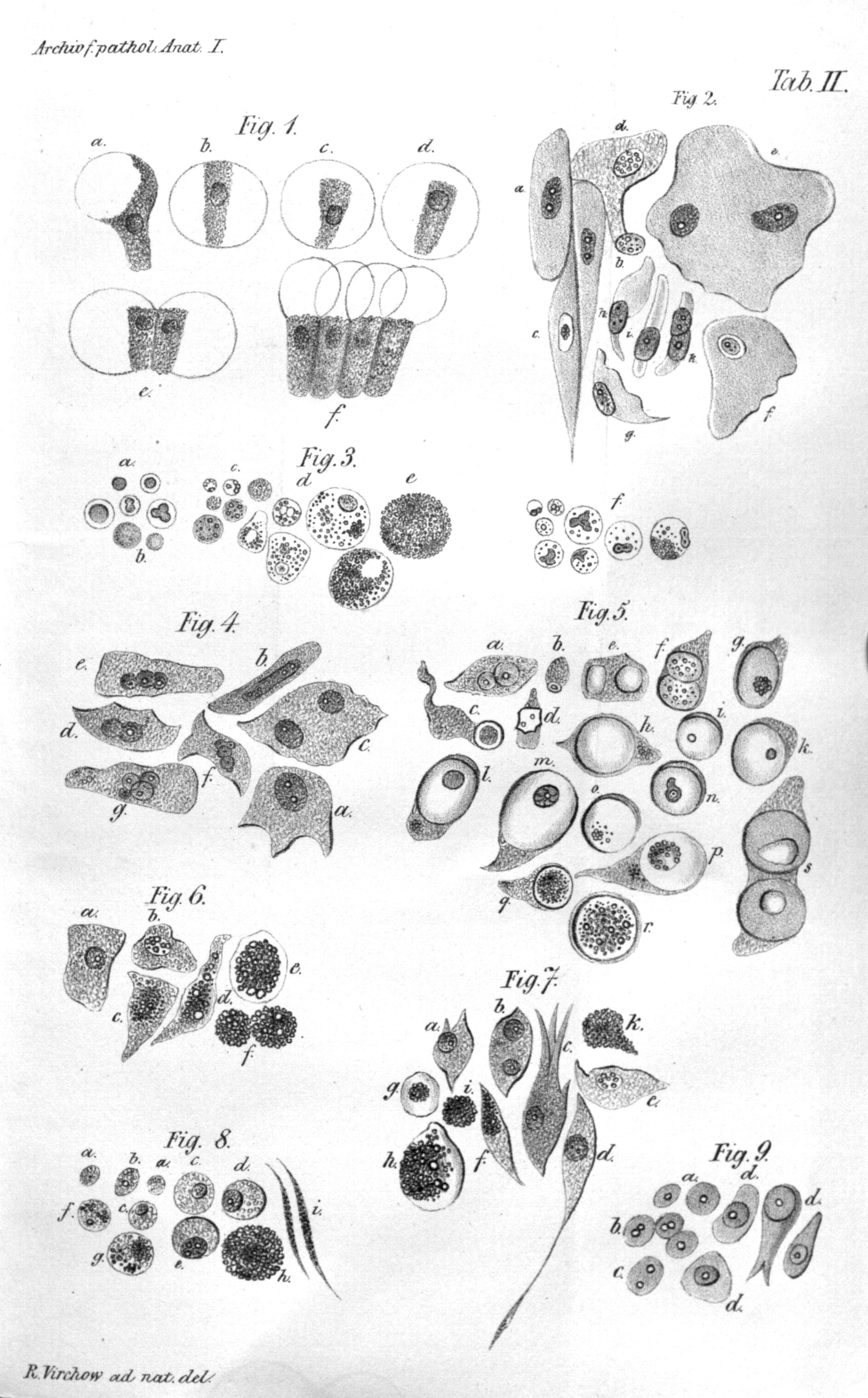
Illustration of Virchow's cell theory

Virchow is credited with several key discoveries. His most widely known scientific contribution is his cell theory, which built on the work of Theodor Schwann. He was one of the first to accept the work of Robert Remak, who showed that the origin of cells was the division of pre-existing cells. He did not initially accept the evidence for cell division and believed that it occurs only in certain types of cells. When it dawned on him in 1855 that Remak might be right, he published Remak's work as his own, causing a falling-out between the two.

Virchow was particularly influenced in cellular theory by the work of John Goodsir of Edinburgh, whom he described as "one of the earliest and most acute observers of cell-life both physiological and pathological". Virchow dedicated his magnum opus Die Cellularpathologie to Goodsir. Virchow's cellular theory was encapsulated in the epigram Omnis cellula e cellula ("all cells (come) from cells"), which he published in 1855. (The epigram was actually coined by François-Vincent Raspail, but popularized by Virchow.) It is a rejection of the concept of spontaneous generation, which held that organisms could arise from nonliving matter. For example, maggots were believed to appear spontaneously in decaying meat; Francesco Redi carried out experiments that disproved this notion and coined the maxim Omne vivum ex ovo ("Every living thing comes from a living thing" — literally "from an egg"); Virchow (and his predecessors) extended this to state that the only source for a living cell was another living cell, and the notion became popularly known as the theory of "biogenesis".

=== Cancer ===
In 1845, Virchow and John Hughes Bennett independently observed abnormal increases in white blood cells in some patients. Virchow correctly identified the condition as a blood disease, and named it leukämie in 1847 (later anglicised to leukemia). In 1857, he was the first to describe a type of tumour called chordoma that originated from the clivus (at the base of the skull).

=== Theory of cancer origin ===
Virchow was the first to correctly link the origin of cancers from otherwise normal cells. (His teacher Müller had proposed that cancers originated from cells, but from special cells, which he called blastema.) In 1855, he suggested that cancers arise from the activation of dormant cells (perhaps similar to cells now known as stem cells) present in mature tissue. Virchow believed that cancer is caused by severe irritation in the tissues, and his theory came to be known as chronic irritation theory. He thought, rather wrongly, that the irritation spread in the form of liquid so that cancer rapidly increases. His theory was largely ignored, as he was proved wrong that it was not by liquid, but by metastasis of the already cancerous cells that cancers spread. (Metastasis was first described by Karl Thiersch in the 1860s.)

He made a crucial observation that certain cancers (carcinoma in the modern sense) were inherently associated with white blood cells (which are now called macrophages) that produced irritation (inflammation). It was only towards the end of the 20th century that Virchow's theory was taken seriously. It was realised that specific cancers (including those of mesothelioma, lung, prostate, bladder, pancreatic, cervical, esophageal, melanoma, and head and neck) are indeed strongly associated with long-term inflammation. In addition it became clear that prolonged use of anti-inflammatory drugs, such as aspirin, reduced cancer risk. Experiments also show that drugs that block inflammation simultaneously inhibit tumour formation and development.

==== The Kaiser's case ====
Virchow was one of the leading physicians to Kaiser Frederick III, who suffered from cancer of the larynx. While other physicians such as Ernst von Bergmann suggested surgical removal of the entire larynx, Virchow was opposed to it because no successful operation of this kind had ever been done. The British surgeon Morell Mackenzie performed a biopsy of the Kaiser in 1887 and sent it to Virchow, who identified it as "pachydermia verrucosa laryngis". Virchow affirmed that the tissues were not cancerous, even after several biopsy tests.

The Kaiser died on 15 June 1888. The next day a post-mortem examination was performed by Virchow and his assistant. They found that the larynx was extensively damaged by ulceration, and microscopic examination confirmed epidermal carcinoma. Die Krankheit Kaiser Friedrich des Dritten (The Medical Report of Kaiser Frederick III) was published on 11 July under the lead authorship of Bergmann. But Virchow and Mackenzie were omitted, and they were particularly criticised for all their works. The arguments between them turned into a century-long controversy, resulting in Virchow being accused of misdiagnosis and malpractice. But reassessment of the diagnostic history revealed that Virchow was right in his findings and decisions. It is now believed that the Kaiser had hybrid verrucous carcinoma, a very rare form of verrucous carcinoma, and that Virchow had no way of correctly identifying it. (The cancer type was correctly identified only in 1948 by Lauren Ackerman.)

=== Inflammation ===
Virchow analysed the four key symptoms of inflammation (redness, swelling, heat and pain) and postulated that inflammation includes several inflammatory processes. He introduced the idea of a fifth symptom, functio laesa, the loss of function of inflamed tissues.

=== Anatomy ===
It was discovered approximately simultaneously by Virchow and Charles Emile Troisier that an enlarged left supraclavicular node is one of the earliest signs of gastrointestinal malignancy, commonly of the stomach, or less commonly, lung cancer. This sign has become known as Virchow's node and simultaneously Troisier's sign.

=== Thromboembolism ===
Virchow is also known for elucidating the mechanism of pulmonary thromboembolism (a condition of blood clotting in the blood vessels), coining the terms embolism and thrombosis. He noted that blood clots in the pulmonary artery originate first from venous thrombi, stating in 1859:

[T]he detachment of larger or smaller fragments from the end of the softening thrombus which are carried along by the current of blood and driven into remote vessels. This gives rise to the very frequent process on which I have bestowed the name of Embolia.

Having made these initial discoveries based on autopsies, he proceeded to put forward a scientific hypothesis; that pulmonary thrombi are transported from the veins of the leg and that the blood has the ability to carry such an object. He then proceeded to prove this hypothesis by well-designed experiments, repeated numerous times to consolidate evidence, and with meticulously detailed methodology. This work rebutted a claim made by the eminent French pathologist Jean Cruveilhier that phlebitis led to clot development and that thus coagulation was the main consequence of venous inflammation. This was a view held by many before Virchow's work. Related to this research, Virchow described the factors contributing to venous thrombosis, Virchow's triad.

=== Pathology ===
Virchow founded the medical fields of cellular pathology and comparative pathology (comparison of diseases common to humans and animals). His most important work in the field was Cellular Pathology (Die Cellularpathologie in ihrer Begründung auf physiologische und pathologische Gewebelehre) published in 1858, as a collection of his lectures. This is regarded as the basis of modern medical science, and the "greatest advance which scientific medicine had made since its beginning."

His very innovative work may be viewed as between that of Giovanni Battista Morgagni, whose work Virchow studied, and that of Paul Ehrlich, who studied at the Charité while Virchow was developing microscopic pathology there. One of Virchow's major contributions to German medical education was to encourage the use of microscopes by medical students, and he was known for constantly urging his students to "think microscopically". He was the first to establish a link between infectious diseases between humans and animals, for which he coined the term "zoonoses". He also introduced scientific terms such as "chromatin", "agenesis", "parenchyma", "osteoid", "amyloid degeneration" and "spina bifida". His concepts on pathology directly opposed humourism, an ancient medical dogma that diseases were due to imbalanced body fluids, hypothetically called humours, that still pervaded.

Virchow was a great influence on Swedish pathologist Axel Key, who worked as his assistant during Key's doctoral studies in Berlin.

==== Parasitology ====
Virchow worked out the life cycle of a roundworm Trichinella spiralis. Virchow noticed a mass of circular white flecks in the muscle of dog and human cadavers, similar to those described by Richard Owen in 1835. He confirmed by microscopic observation that the white particles were indeed the larvae of roundworms, curled up in the muscle tissue. Rudolph Leukart found that these tiny worms could develop into adult roundworms in the intestine of a dog. He correctly asserted that these worms could also cause human helminthiasis. Virchow further demonstrated that if the infected meat is first heated to 137 °F (58 °C) for 10 minutes, the worms could not infect dogs or humans. He established that human roundworm infection occurs via contaminated pork. This directly led to the establishment of meat inspection, which was first adopted in Berlin.

=== Autopsy ===
Virchow was the first to develop a systematic method of autopsy, based on his knowledge of cellular pathology. The modern autopsy still constitutes his techniques. His first significant autopsy was on a 50-year-old woman in 1845. He found an unusual number of white blood cells, and gave a detailed description in 1847 and named the condition as leukämie. One of his autopsies in 1857 was the first description of vertebral disc rupture. His autopsy on a baby in 1856 was the first description of congenital pulmonary lymphangiectasia (the name given by K. M. Laurence a century later), a rare and fatal disease of the lung. From his experience of post-mortem examinations of cadavers, he published his method in a small book in 1876. His book was the first to describe the techniques of autopsy specifically to examine abnormalities in organs, and retain important tissues for further examination and demonstration. Unlike any other earlier practitioner, he practiced complete surgery of all body parts with body organs dissected one by one. This has become the standard method.

==== Ochronosis ====
Virchow discovered the clinical syndrome which he called ochronosis, a metabolic disorder in which a patient accumulates homogentisic acid in connective tissues and which can be identified by discolouration seen under the microscope. He found the unusual symptom in an autopsy of the corpse of a 67-year-old man on 8 May 1884. This was the first time this abnormal disease affecting cartilage and connective tissue was observed and characterised. His description and coining of the name appeared in the October 1866 issue of Virchows Archiv.

=== Forensic work ===
Virchow was the first to analyse hair in criminal investigation, and made the first forensic report on it in 1861. He was called as an expert witness in a murder case, and he used hair samples collected from the victim. He became the first to recognise the limitation of hair as evidence. He found that hairs can be different in an individual, that individual hair has characteristic features, and that hairs from different individuals can be strikingly similar. He concluded that evidence based on hair analysis is inconclusive. His testimony runs:

[T]he hairs found on the defendant do not possess any so pronounced peculiarities or individualities [so] that no one with certainty has the right to assert that they must have originated from the head of the victim.

=== Anthropology and prehistory biology ===
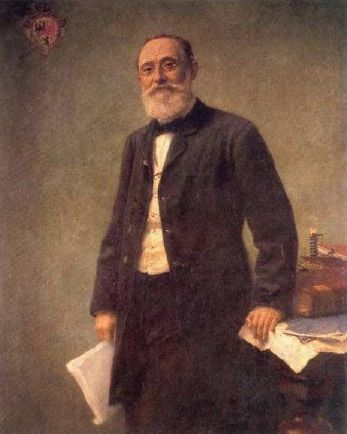
Portrait of Rudolf Virchow by Hugo Vogel, 1861

Virchow developed an interest in anthropology in 1865, when he discovered pile dwellings in northern Germany. In 1869, he co-founded the German Anthropological Association. In 1870 he founded the Berlin Society for Anthropology, Ethnology and Prehistory (Berliner Gesellschaft für Anthropologie, Ethnologie und Urgeschichte) which was very influential in coordinating and intensifying German archaeological research. Until his death, Virchow was several times (at least fifteen times) its president, often taking turns with his former student Adolf Bastian. As president, Virchow frequently contributed to and co-edited the society's main journal Zeitschrift für Ethnologie (Journal of Ethnology), which Adolf Bastian, together with another student of Virchow, Robert Hartman, had founded in 1869.

In 1870, he led a major excavation of the hill forts in Pomerania. He also excavated wall mounds in Wöllstein in 1875 with Robert Koch, whose paper he edited on the subject. For his contributions in German archaeology, the Rudolf Virchow lecture is held annually in his honour. He made field trips to Asia Minor, the Caucasus, Egypt, Nubia and other places, sometimes in the company of Heinrich Schliemann. His 1879 journey to the site of Troy is described in Beiträge zur Landeskunde in Troas ("Contributions to the knowledge of the landscape in Troy", 1879) and Alttrojanische Gräber und Schädel ("Old Trojan graves and skulls", 1882).

==== Anti-Darwinism ====
Virchow was an opponent of Darwin's theory of evolution, and particularly skeptical of the emergent thesis of human evolution. He did not reject evolutionary theory as a whole, and viewed the theory of natural selection as "an immeasurable advance" but that still has no "actual proof". On 22 September 1877, he delivered a public address entitled "The Freedom of Science in the Modern State" before the Congress of German Naturalists and Physicians in Munich. There he spoke against the teaching of the theory of evolution in schools, arguing that it was as yet an unproven hypothesis that lacked empirical foundations and that, therefore, its teaching would negatively affect scientific studies. Ernst Haeckel, who had been Virchow's student, later reported that his former professor said that "it is quite certain that man did not descend from the apes...not caring in the least that now almost all experts of good judgment hold the opposite conviction."

Virchow became one of the leading opponents on the debate over the authenticity of Neanderthal, discovered in 1856, as distinct species and ancestral to modern humans. He himself examined the original fossil in 1872, and presented his observations before the Berliner Gesellschaft für Anthropologie, Ethnologie und Urgeschichte. He stated that the Neanderthal had not been a primitive form of human, but an abnormal human being, who, judging by the shape of his skull, had been injured and deformed, and considering the unusual shape of his bones, had been arthritic, rickety and feeble. With such an authority, the fossil was rejected as new species. With this reasoning, Virchow "judged Darwin an ignoramus and Haeckel a fool and was loud and frequent in the publication of these judgments," and declared that "it is quite certain that man did not descend from the apes." The Neanderthals were later accepted as distinct species of humans, Homo neanderthalensis.

On 22 September 1877, at the Fiftieth Conference of the German Association of Naturalists and Physician held in Munich, Haeckel pleaded for introducing evolution in the public school curricula, and tried to dissociate Darwinism from social Darwinism. His campaign was because of Herman Müller, a school teacher who was banned because of his teaching a year earlier on the inanimate origin of life from carbon. This resulted in prolonged public debate with Virchow. A few days later Virchow responded that Darwinism was only a hypothesis, and morally dangerous to students. This severe criticism of Darwinism was immediately taken up by the London Times, from which further debates erupted among English scholars. Haeckel wrote his arguments in the October issue of Nature titled "The Present Position of Evolution Theory", to which Virchow responded in the next issue with an article "The Liberty of Science in the Modern State". Virchow stated that teaching of evolution was "contrary to the conscience of the natural scientists, who reckons only with facts." The debate led Haeckel to write a full book Freedom in Science and Teaching in 1879. That year the issue was discussed in the Prussian House of Representatives and the verdict was in favour of Virchow. In 1882 the Prussian education policy officially excluded natural history in schools.

Years later, the noted German physician Carl Ludwig Schleich would recall a conversation he held with Virchow, who was a close friend of his: "...On to the subject of Darwinism. 'I don't believe in all this,' Virchow told me. 'if I lie on my sofa and blow the possibilities away from me, as another man may blow the smoke of his cigar, I can, of course, sympathize with such dreams. But they don't stand the test of knowledge. Haeckel is a fool. That will be apparent one day. As far as that goes, if anything like transmutation did occur it could only happen in the course of pathological degeneration!'"

Virchow's ultimate opinion about evolution was reported a year before he died; in his own words:

The intermediate form is unimaginable save in a dream... We cannot teach or consent that it is an achievement that man descended from the ape or other animal.

— Homiletic Review, January, (1901)

Virchow's anti-evolutionism, like that of Albert von Kölliker and Thomas Brown, did not come from religion, since he was not a believer.

==== Anti-racism ====
Virchow believed that Haeckel's monist propagation of social Darwinism was in its nature politically dangerous and anti-democratic, and he also criticized it because he saw it as related to the emergent nationalist movement in Germany, ideas about cultural superiority, and militarism. In 1885, he launched a study of craniometry, which gave results contradictory to contemporary scientific racist theories on the "Aryan race", leading him to denounce the "Nordic mysticism" at the 1885 Anthropology Congress in Karlsruhe. Josef Kollmann, a collaborator of Virchow, stated at the same congress that the people of Europe, be they German, Italian, English or French, belonged to a "mixture of various races", further declaring that the "results of craniology" led to a "struggle against any theory concerning the superiority of this or that European race" over others. He analysed the hair, skin and eye colour of 6,758,827 schoolchildren to identify the Jews and Aryans. His findings, published in 1886 and concluding that there could be neither a Jewish nor a German race, were regarded as a blow to anti-Semitism and the existence of an "Aryan race".

=== Anti-germ theory of diseases ===
Virchow did not believe in the germ theory of diseases, as advocated by Louis Pasteur and Robert Koch. He proposed that diseases came from abnormal activities inside the cells, not from outside pathogens. He believed that epidemics were social in origin, and the way to combat epidemics was political, not medical. He regarded germ theory as a hindrance to prevention and cure. He considered social factors such as poverty major causes of disease. He even attacked Koch's and Ignaz Semmelweis' policy of handwashing as an antiseptic practice, who said of him: "Explorers of nature recognize no bugbears other than individuals who speculate." He postulated that germs were only using infected organs as habitats, but were not the cause, and stated, "If I could live my life over again, I would devote it to proving that germs seek their natural habitat: diseased tissue, rather than being the cause of diseased tissue".

== Politics and social medicine ==
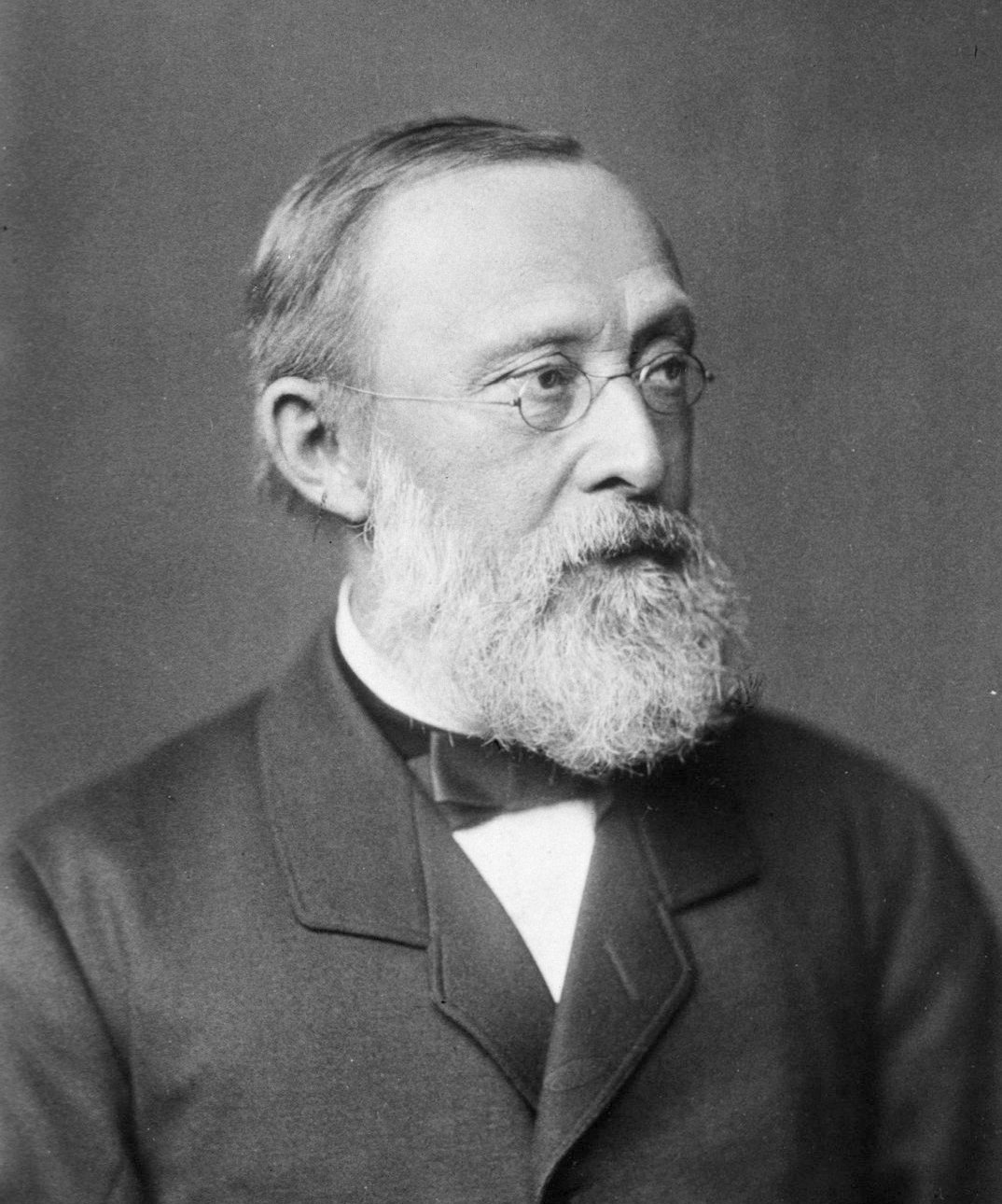
Rudolf Virchow

More than a laboratory physician, Virchow was an impassioned advocate for social and political reform. His ideology involved social inequality as the cause of diseases that requires political actions, stating:

Medicine is a social science, and politics is nothing else but medicine on a large scale. Medicine, as a social science, as the science of human beings, has the obligation to point out problems and to attempt their theoretical solution: the politician, the practical anthropologist, must find the means for their actual solution... Science for its own sake usually means nothing more than science for the sake of the people who happen to be pursuing it. Knowledge which is unable to support action is not genuine – and how unsure is activity without understanding... If medicine is to fulfill her great task, then she must enter the political and social life... The physicians are the natural attorneys of the poor, and the social problems should largely be solved by them.

Virchow actively worked for social change to fight poverty and diseases. His methods involved pathological observations and statistical analyses. He called this new field of social medicine a "social science". His most important influences could be noted in Latin America, where his disciples introduced his social medicine. For example, his student Max Westenhöfer became Director of Pathology at the medical school of the University of Chile, becoming the most influential advocate. One of Westenhöfer's students, Salvador Allende, through social and political activities based on Virchow's doctrine, became the 29th President of Chile (1970–1973).

Virchow made himself known as a pronounced pro-democracy progressive in the year of revolutions in Germany (1848). His political views are evident in his Report on the Typhus Outbreak of Upper Silesia, where he states that the outbreak could not be solved by treating individual patients with drugs or with minor changes in food, housing, or clothing laws, but only through radical action to promote the advancement of an entire population, which could be achieved only by "full and unlimited democracy" and "education, freedom and prosperity".

These radical statements and his minor part in the revolution caused the government to remove him from his position in 1849, although within a year he was reinstated as prosector "on probation". Prosector was a secondary position in the hospital. This secondary position in Berlin convinced him to accept the chair of pathological anatomy at the medical school in the provincial town of Würzburg, where he continued his scientific research. Six years later, he had attained fame in scientific and medical circles, and was reinstated at Charité Hospital.

In 1859, he became a member of the Municipal Council of Berlin and began his career as a civic reformer. Elected to the Prussian Diet in 1862, he became leader of the Radical or Progressive party; and from 1880 to 1893, he was a member of the Reichstag. He worked to improve healthcare conditions for Berlin citizens, especially by working towards modern water and sewer systems. Virchow is credited as a founder of anthropology and of social medicine, frequently focusing on the fact that disease is never purely biological, but often socially derived or spread. Virchow advocated for local self-government and minority rights, including for the large Polish ethnic group in Prussia, and resolutely opposed the emerging anti-Semitic tendencies in Germany. He was also a critic of Germany's colonial policy.

=== Duel challenge by Bismarck ===
As a co-founder and member of the liberal party Deutsche Fortschrittspartei, he was a leading political antagonist of Bismarck. He was opposed to Bismarck's excessive military budget, which angered Bismarck sufficiently that he challenged Virchow to a duel in 1865. Virchow declined because he considered dueling an uncivilized way to solve a conflict. Various English-language sources purport a different version of events, the so-called "Sausage Duel". It has Virchow, being the one challenged and therefore entitled to choose the weapons, selecting two pork sausages, one loaded with Trichinella larvae, the other safe; Bismarck declined. However, there are no German-language documents confirming this version.

=== Kulturkampf ===
Virchow supported Bismarck in an attempt to reduce the political and social influence of the Catholic Church, between 1871 and 1887. He remarked that the movement was acquiring "the character of a great struggle in the interest of humanity". He called it Kulturkampf ("culture struggle") during the discussion of Adalbert Falk's May Laws (Maigesetze). Virchow was respected in Masonic circles, and according to one source may have been a freemason, though no official record of this has been found.

== Personal life ==
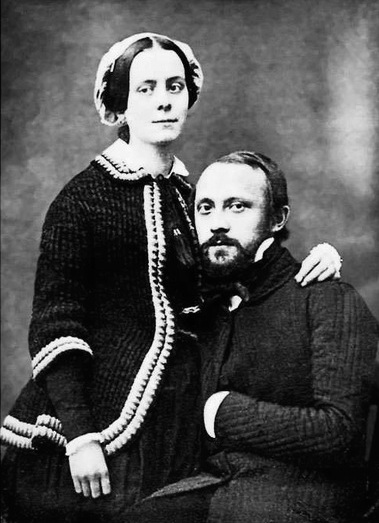
Rudolf and Rose Virchow in 1851

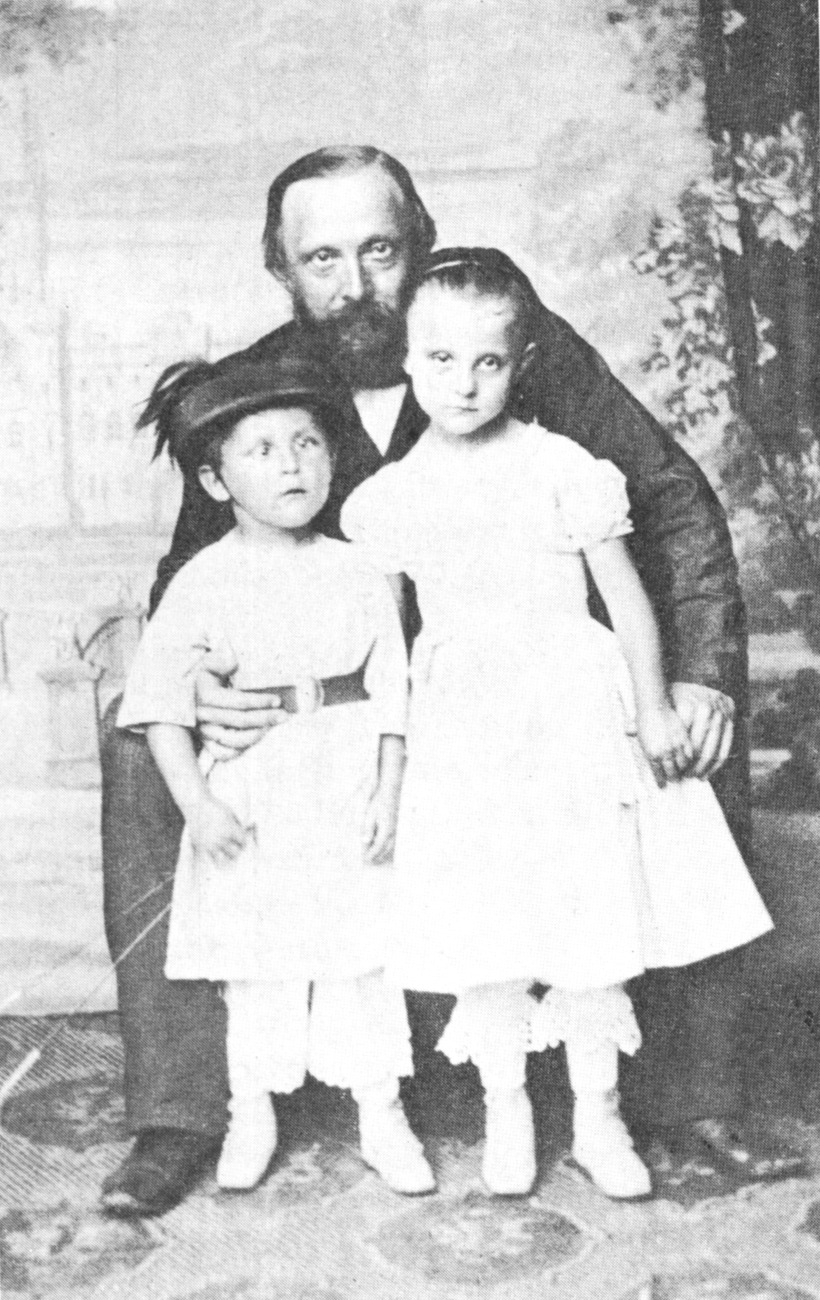
Virchow with his son Ernst and daughter Adele

On 24 August 1850 in Berlin, Virchow married Ferdinande Rosalie Mayer, a liberal's daughter. They had three sons and three daughters:

- Karl Virchow (1 August 1851 – 21 September 1912), a chemist
- Hans Virchow (10 September 1852 – 7 April 1940), an anatomist
- Adele Virchow (1 October 1855 – 18 May 1955), the wife of Rudolf Henning, a professor of German studies
- Ernst Virchow (24 January 1858 – 5 April 1942)
- Marie Virchow (29 June 1866 – 23 October 1951), the editor of Rudolf Virchow, Briefe an Seine Eltern, 1839 bis 1864 (published in 1906) and the wife of Carl Rabl, an Austrian anatomist
- Hanna Elisabeth Maria Virchow (10 May 1873 – 28 November 1963)

=== Death ===
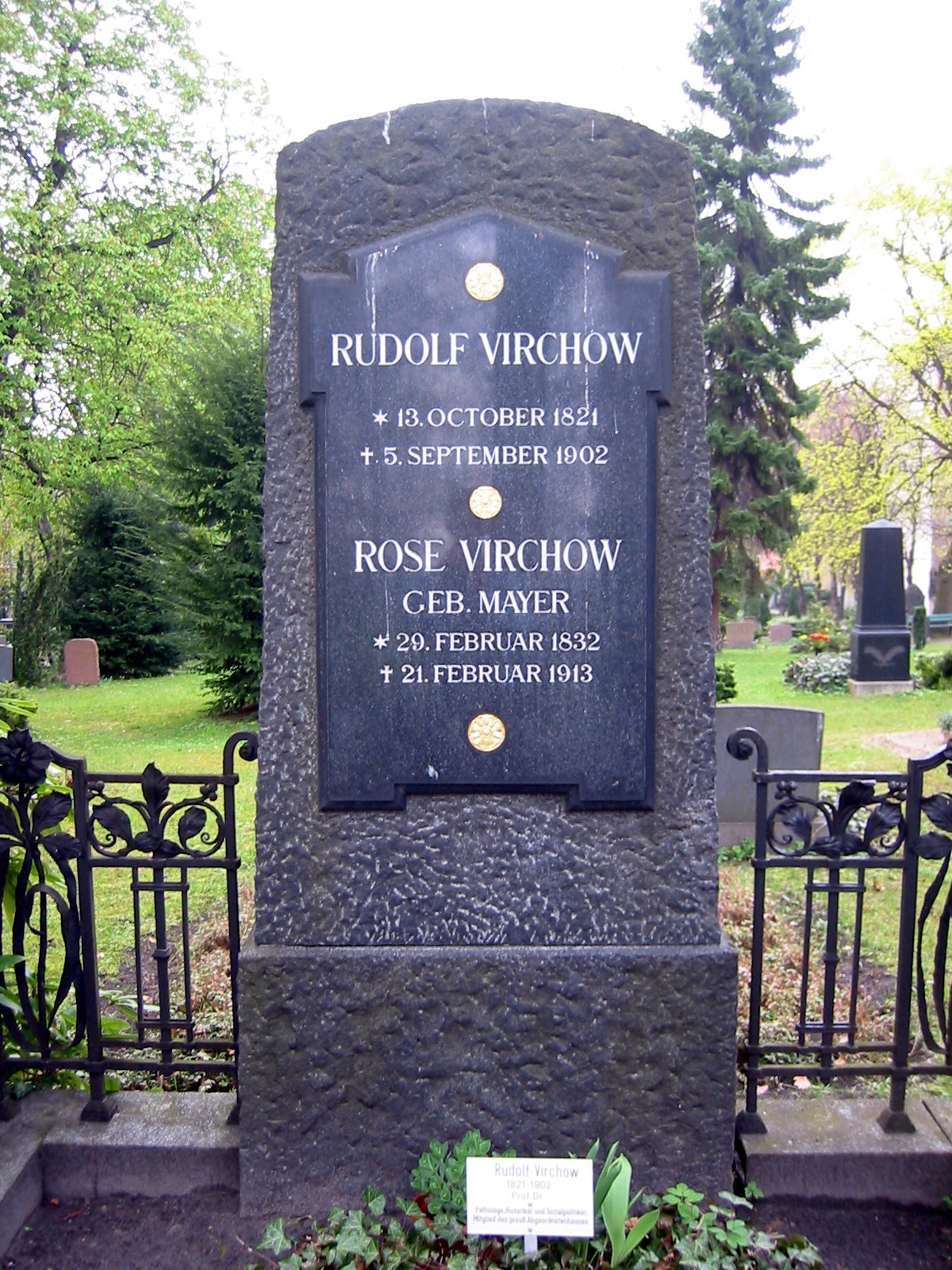
The tomb of Rudolf and Rose Virchow at Alter St.-Matthäus-Kirchhof

Virchow broke his thigh bone on 4 January 1902, jumping off a running streetcar while exiting the electric tramway. Although he anticipated full recovery, the fractured femur never healed, and restricted his physical activity. His health gradually deteriorated and he died of heart failure after eight months, on 5 September 1902, in Berlin, a month before his 81st birthday. A state funeral was held on 9 September in the Assembly Room of the Magistracy in the Berlin Town Hall, which was decorated with laurels, palms and flowers. He was buried in the Alter St.-Matthäus-Kirchhof in Schöneberg, Berlin. His tomb was shared by his wife on 21 February 1913.

== Collections and foundations ==
Rudolf Virchow was also a collector. Several museums in Berlin emerged from Virchow's collections: the Märkisches Museum, the Museum of Prehistory and Early History, the Ethnological Museum and the Museum of Medical History. In addition, Virchow's collection of anatomical specimens from numerous European and non-European populations, which still exists today, deserves special mention. The collection is owned by the Berlin Society for Anthropology and Prehistory. The collection hit the international headlines in 2020 when the two journalists Markus Grill and David Bruser, in cooperation with the archivist Nils Seethaler, succeeded in identifying four skulls of indigenous Canadians that were thought to be lost and which came into Virchow's possession through the mediation of the Canadian doctor William Osler in the late 19th century.

== Honours and legacy ==
- In June 1859, Virchow was elected to Berlin Chamber of Representatives.
- In 1860, he was elected official Member of the Königliche Wissenschaftliche Deputation für das Medizinalwesen (Royal Scientific Board for Medical Affairs).
- In 1861, he was elected foreign member of the Royal Swedish Academy of Sciences.
- In 1862, he was elected as an international Member of the American Philosophical Society.
- In March 1862, he was elected to the Prussian House of Representatives.
- In 1873, he was elected to the Prussian Academy of Sciences. He declined to be ennobled as "von Virchow," he was nonetheless designated Geheimrat ("privy councillor") in 1894.
- In 1880, he was elected member of the Reichstag of the German Empire.
- In 1881, Rudolf-Virchow-Foundation was established on the occasion of his 60th birthday.
- In 1892, he was appointed Rector of the Berlin University.
- In 1892, he was awarded the British Royal Society's Copley Medal.
- The Rudolf Virchow Center, a biomedical research center in the University of Würzburg was established in January 2002.
- Rudolf Virchow Award is given by the Society for Medical Anthropology for research achievements in medical anthropology.
- Rudolf Virchow lecture, an annual public lecture, is organised by the Römisch-Germanisches Zentralmuseum Mainz, for eminent scientists in the field of palaeolithic archaeology.
- Rudolf Virchow Medical Society is based in New York, and offers Rudolf Virchow Medal.

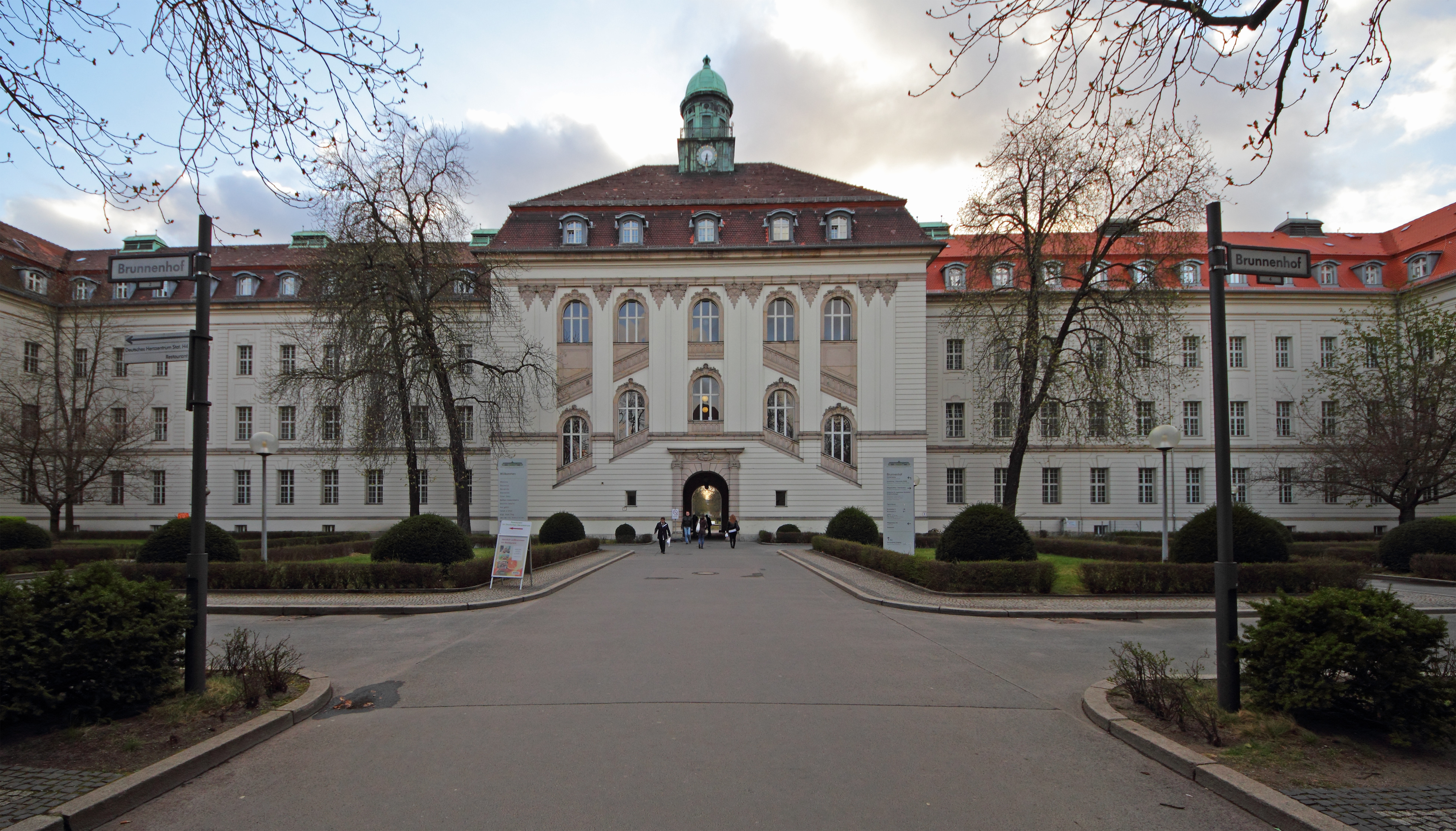
Hospital – Campus Virchow Klinikum, Cardiology Center

- Campus Virchow Klinikum (CVK) is the name of a campus of Charité hospital in Berlin.
- The Rudolf Virchow Monument, a muscular limestone statue, was erected in 1910 at Karlplatz in Berlin.
- Langenbeck-Virchow-Haus was built in 1915 in Berlin, jointly honouring Virchow and Bernhard von Langenbeck. Originally a medical centre, the building is now used as conference centre of the German Surgical Association (Deutsche Gesellschaft für Chirurgie) and the Berlin Medical Association (BMG-Berliner Medizinische Gesellschaft).
- The Rudolf Virchow Study Center is instituted by the European University Viadrina for compiling of the complete works of Virchow.
- Virchow Hill in Antarctica is named after Rudolf Virchow.

=== Eponymous medical terms ===
- Virchow's angle, the angle between the nasobasilar line and the nasosubnasal line
- Virchow's cell, a macrophage in Hansen's disease
- Virchow's cell theory, omnis cellula e cellula – every living cell comes from another living cell
- Virchow's concept of pathology, comparison of diseases common to humans and animals
- Virchow's disease, leontiasis ossea, now recognized as a symptom rather than a disease
- Virchow's gland, Virchow's node
- Virchow's law, during craniosynostosis, skull growth is restricted to a plane perpendicular to the affected, prematurely fused suture and is enhanced in a plane parallel to it.
- Virchow's line, a line from the root of the nose to the lambda
- Virchow's metamorphosis, lipomatosis in the heart and salivary glands
- Virchow's method of autopsy, a method of autopsy where each organ is taken out one by one
- Virchow's node, the presence of metastatic cancer in a lymph node in the supraclavicular fossa (root of the neck left of the midline), also known as Troisier's sign
- Virchow's psammoma, psammoma bodies in meningiomas
- Virchow–Robin spaces, enlarged perivascular spaces (EPVS) (often only potential) that surround blood vessels for a short distance as they enter the brain
- Virchow–Seckel syndrome, a very rare disease also known as "bird-headed dwarfism"
- Virchow skull breaker, a chisel-like device used to separate the calvaria from the rest of the skull to expose the brain in autopsies
- Virchow's triad, the classic factors which precipitate venous thrombus formation: endothelial dysfunction or injury, hemodynamic changes, and hypercoagulability

== Works ==
Virchow was a prolific writer. Some of his works are:

- Mittheilungen über die in Oberschlesien herrschende Typhus-Epidemie (1848)
- Die Cellularpathologie in ihrer Begründung auf physiologische und pathologische Gewebelehre., his chief work (1859; English translation, 1860): The fourth edition of this work formed the first volume of Vorlesungen über Pathologie below.
- Handbuch der Speciellen Pathologie und Therapie, prepared in collaboration with others (1854–76)
- Vorlesungen über Pathologie (1862–72)
- Die krankhaften Geschwülste (1863–67)
- Ueber den Hungertyphus (1868)
- Ueber einige Merkmale niederer Menschenrassen am Schädel (1875)
- Beiträge zur physischen Anthropologie der Deutschen (1876)
- Die Freiheit der Wissenschaft im Modernen Staat (1877)
- Gesammelte Abhandlungen aus dem Gebiete der offentlichen Medizin und der Seuchenlehre (1879)
- Gegen den Antisemitismus (1880)
