= Ulcer =

Inflamed break in bodily tissue that impedes function of the affected organ

Ulcers
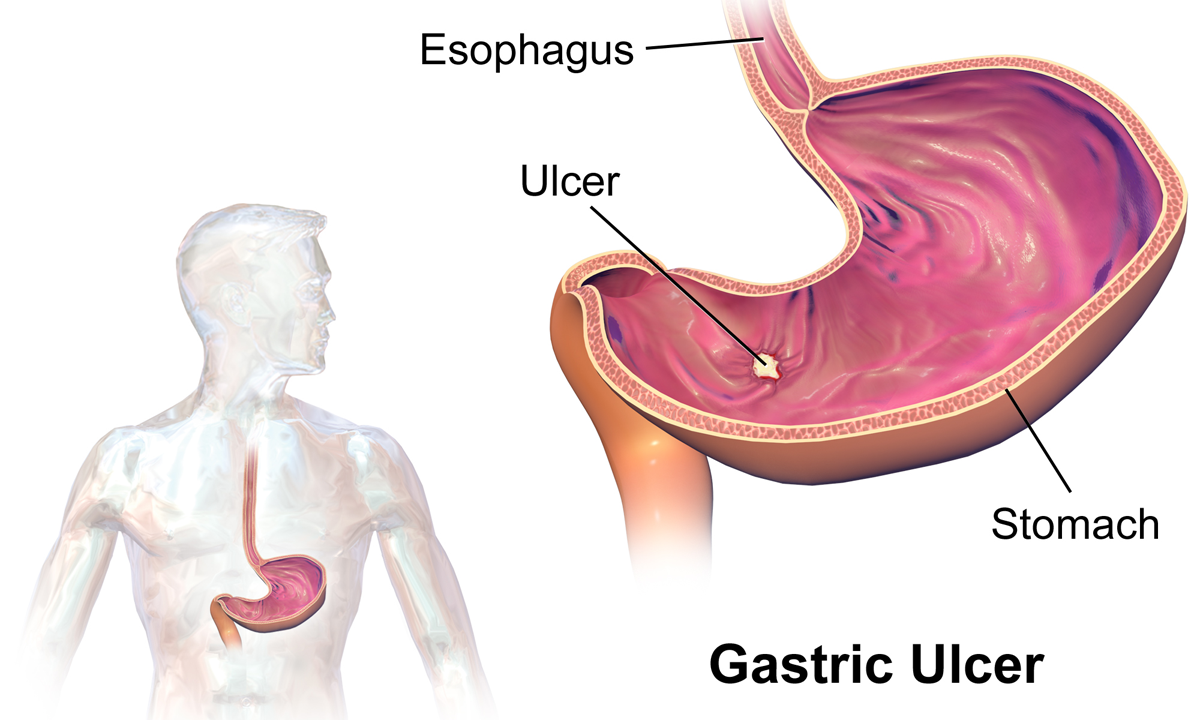
- Gastric ulcer

An ulcer is a discontinuity or break in a bodily membrane that impedes normal function of the affected organ. According to Robbins's pathology, "ulcer is the breach of the continuity of skin, epithelium or mucous membrane caused by sloughing out of inflamed necrotic tissue." Common forms of ulcers recognized in medicine include:

- Ulcer (dermatology), a discontinuity of the skin or a break in the skin.
  - Pressure ulcers, also known as bedsores
  - Genital ulcer, an ulcer located on the genital area
  - Ulcerative dermatitis, a skin disorder associated with bacterial growth often initiated by self-trauma
  - Anal fissure, an ulcer or tear near the anus or within the rectum
  - Diabetic foot ulcer, a major complication of the diabetic foot
- Callous ulcer, a chronic nonhealing ulcer with hard indurated base and inelastic margins
- Corneal ulcer, an inflammatory or infective condition of the cornea
- Mouth ulcer, an open sore inside the mouth.
  - Aphthous ulcer, a specific type of oral ulcer also known as a canker sore
- Peptic ulcer, a discontinuity of the gastrointestinal mucosa (stomach ulcer)
- Venous ulcer, a wound thought to occur due to improper functioning of valves in the veins
- Stress ulcer, an ulcer located within the stomach and proximal duodenum
- Ulcerative sarcoidosis, a cutaneous condition affecting people with sarcoidosis
- Ulcerative lichen planus, a rare variant of lichen planus
- Ulcerative colitis, a form of inflammatory bowel disease (IBD).
- Ulcerative disposition, a disorder or discomfort that causes severe abdominal distress, often associated with chronic gastritis
