= Rudolf Virchow Monument =

Monument in Berlin, Germany

- Rudolf-Virchow-Denkmal (German)
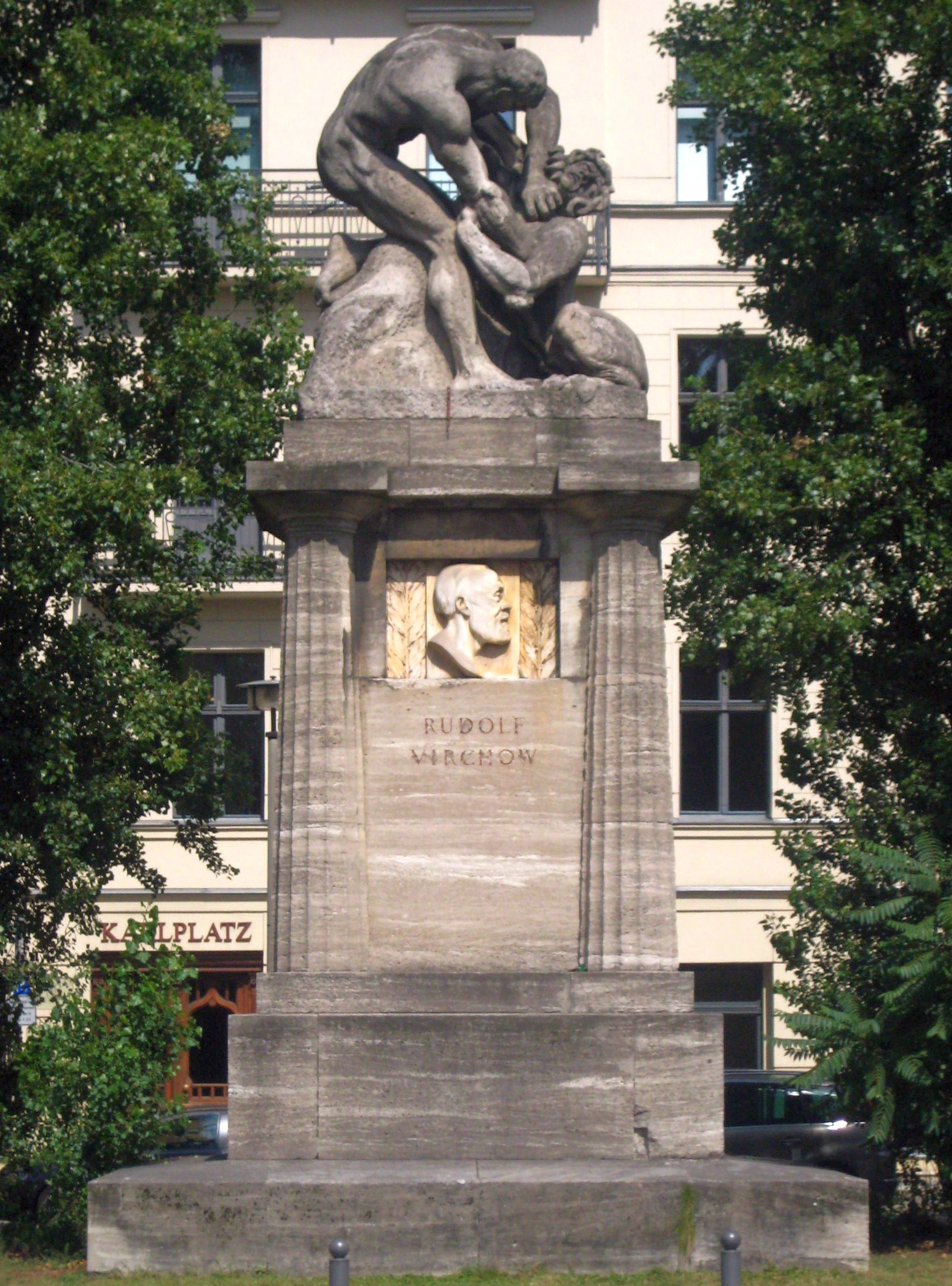
- The monument in 2009
- Location: Berlin, Germany; 52°31′22″N 13°22′46″E

The Rudolf Virchow Monument (German: Rudolf-Virchow-Denkmal) is an outdoor monument to Rudolf Virchow, who was a pathologist, archaeologist, politician and public-health reformer. The monument was created in the neoclassical style by Fritz Klimsch from 1906 to 1910, and is located on Karlplatz in Berlin-Mitte, Germany. The figure atop the pedestal is an allegorical representation of mankind's struggle against disease.
