= Alexandra W. Busch =

German Roman archaeologist, professor, and museum director

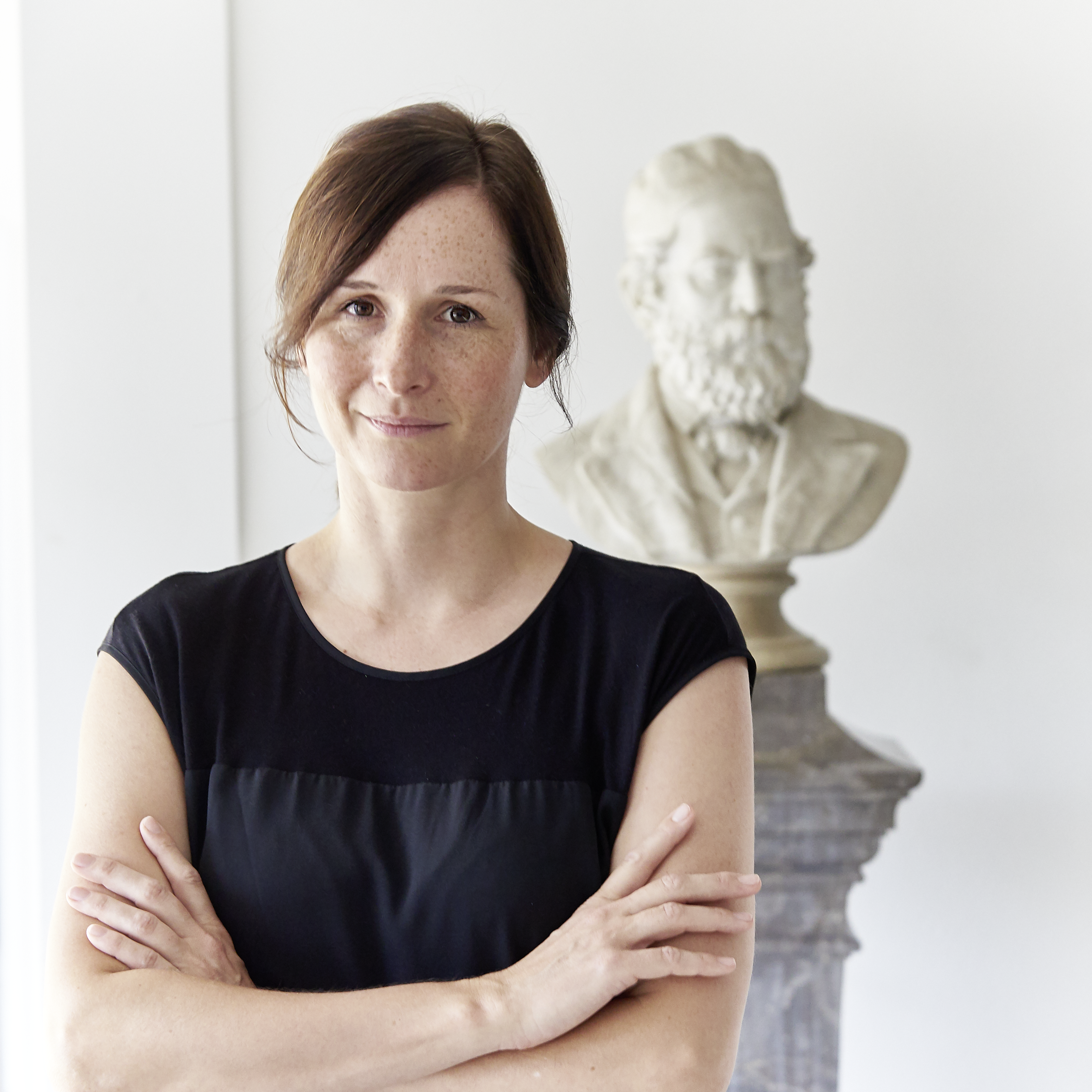
- Born: 1975 (age 50–51); Neuss
- Education: University of Cologne
- Employer: Römisch-Germanisches Zentralmuseum
- Known for: Director General of the Römisch-Germanisches Zentralmuseum

Alexandra Wilhelmine Busch (born 1975) is a German Roman archaeologist. She is the director general of the Römisch-Germanisches Zentralmuseum.

== Life ==
Busch was born in Neuss in 1975. She began studying Classical archaeology, ancient history, and prehistory at the University of Cologne in 1995. She received her doctorate in 2004. Her dissertation was on "Urban Culture in the Roman Empire".

In 2005/06 she received a grant from the German Archaeological Institute and was a trainee and then a research consultant at the Xanten Archeology Park from 2006 to 2008. She then worked at the German Archaeological Institute at Rome, first as a general consultant, then as head of the photo library. In 2011 she published "Militär in Rom" which describes the military forces stationed within Imperial Rome. From the reign of Augustus there were 10,000–40,000 soldiers barracked in Rome and her book records their history. In 2013 she became a corresponding member of the German Archaeological Institute.

In May 2014, Busch became the Director of Collections, Library, Archives and IT, as well as Head of Roman Archaeology, at the Römisch-Germanisches Zentralmuseum in Mainz. In October 2018 she became the General Director of the museum. Busch replaced Falko Daim, who had retired the year before. Busch has announced plans to create a new building at the museum by 2020.

Busch is a professor of archaeology at the Johannes Gutenberg University in Mainz.
