= Virchow's triad =

Three factors thought to cause internal blood clots (thrombosis)

- Virchow's triad
- Differential diagnosis: thrombosis

Virchow's triad or the triad of Virchow (/ˈfɪərkoʊ/) describes the three broad categories of factors that are thought to contribute to thrombosis.

- Hypercoagulability
- Hemodynamic changes (stasis, turbulence)
- Endothelial injury/dysfunction

It is named after the renowned German physician Rudolf Virchow (1821–1902). However, the elements comprising Virchow's triad were not proposed by Virchow. Neither did he ever suggest a triad to describe the pathogenesis of venous thrombosis. In fact, it was not until decades after Virchow's death that a consensus was reached proposing that thrombosis is the result of alterations in blood flow, vascular endothelial injury, or alterations in the constitution of the blood. Still, the modern understanding of the factors leading to embolism is similar to the description provided by Virchow. Virchow's triad remains a useful concept for clinicians and pathologists alike in understanding the contributors to thrombosis.

== The triad ==
The triad consists of three components:

Virchow's	Modern	Notes
Phenomena of interrupted blood-flow	Stasis	The first category, alterations in normal blood flow, refers to several situations. These include venous stasis, long surgical operations, prolonged immobility (whilst on a long plane or car ride, bed bound during hospitalization), and varicose veins. The equivalence of Virchow's version and the modern version has been disputed.
Phenomena associated with irritation of the vessel and its vicinity	Endothelial injury or vessel wall injury	The second category, injuries and/or trauma to endothelium includes vessel piercings and damages arising from shear stress or hypertension. This category is ruled by surface phenomena and contact with procoagulant surfaces, such as bacteria, shards of foreign materials, biomaterials of implants or medical devices, membranes of activated platelets, and membranes of monocytes in chronic inflammation.
Phenomena of blood-coagulation	Hypercoagulability	The last category, alterations in the constitution of blood, has numerous possible risk factors such as hyperviscosity, coagulation factor V Leiden mutation, coagulation factor II G2021A mutation, deficiency of antithrombin III, protein C or S deficiency, nephrotic syndrome, changes after severe trauma or burn, cancer, late pregnancy and delivery, race, advanced age, cigarette smoking, hormonal contraceptives, and obesity. All of these risk factors can cause the situation called hypercoagulability (excessively easy clotting of blood).

== History ==
The origin of the term "Virchow's Triad" is of historical interest, and has been subject to reinterpretation in recent years. While both Virchow's and the modern triads describe thrombosis, the previous triad has been characterized as "the consequences of thrombosis", and the modern triad as "the causes of thrombosis".

Rudolf Virchow elucidated the etiology of pulmonary embolism, whereby thrombi occurring within the veins, particularly those of the extremities, become dislodged and migrate to the pulmonary vasculature. He published his description in 1856. In detailing the pathophysiology surrounding pulmonary embolism, he alluded to many of the factors known to contribute to venous thrombosis. While these factors had already been previously established in the medical literature by others, for unclear reasons they ultimately became known as Virchow's triad. This eponym did not emerge in the literature until long after Virchow's death. One estimate of the first use of the phrase dates it to the early 1950s.

Although the concept of the triad is usually attributed to Virchow, he did not include endothelial injury in his description. This has been attributed to a dispute Virchow had with Jean Cruveilhier, who considered local trauma of primary importance in the development of pulmonary artery thrombosis.
