= Callous ulcer =

- Specialty: Dermatology

Callous ulcer is a chronic nonhealing ulcer with hard indurated base and inelastic margins. It usually contains unhealthy pale granulation tissue. It may last for months to years and does not show any tendency to heal.

== See also ==
- Chronic ulcer
