= Rudolf Virchow lecture =

Annual public archaeology lecture

The Rudolf Virchow lecture was an annual public lecture delivered by an eminent researcher in the field of Palaeolithic archaeology in Neuwied (Germany). The lecture was held in honour of the German physician, archaeologist and politician Rudolf Virchow and his contributions to German archaeology, whilst at the same time also honouring the outstanding accomplishments of the invited speaker. The lecture series was discontinued after 2016, when a new prize, the HUMAN ROOTS AWARD was established to recognise significant achievements that have had an outstanding impact or great influence in understanding the archaeology of human behavioural evolution.

== Background ==
Laureates were chosen based on their contributions to the field of Palaeolithic archaeology and nomination and presentation of the prize were carried out by Römisch-Germanisches Zentralmuseum Mainz, which had particularly close ties with Virchow. For many years Virchow was a member of the board of directors of the museum and campaigned for its independence.

It was also Virchow, who was largely responsible for the establishment of an interdisciplinary, scientific archaeology. Through his efforts, disciplines such as anthropology, zoology, botany, geology, and chemistry were established as accepted means of inquiry within archaeology. At the same time, the liberal politician also campaigned for social equality and against anti-Semitism.

The Rudolf-Virchow lecture was held at the Schlosstheater Neuwied. To make the lecture accessible to a broad spectrum of the public the lecture is held in German. It was one of the most long-standing archaeological public lecture series with focus on Palaeolithic archaeology in Germany.

== List of Rudolf Virchow lectures ==
Year	Laureate	Lecture title
1987	Prof. Dr. Hans-Georg Bandi	Die Schweiz zur Rentierzeit (15.000 -10.000 v. Chr.)
1988	Prof Dr. Karl Dietrich Adam	Der Urmensch von Steinheim an der Murr und seine Umwelt - Ein Lebensbild aus der Zeit vor einer Viertel Million Jahren
1989	Prof. Dr. Wolfgang Taute	Erste Bauern - Letzte Jäger, Vorderer Orient und Mitteleuropa im Vergleich (11.000 - 4.000 v. Chr.)
1990	Prof. Dr. Avraham Ronen	Neandertaler und früher Homo sapiens im Nahen Osten
1991	Prof. Dr. Valery P. Alekseyev	Menschen der Altsteinzeit aus dem Gebiet der Sowjetunion
1992	Prof. Dr. Gerhard Bosinski	Die ersten Menschen in Eurasien
1993	Dr. Wil Roebroeks	Das Bild vom Urmenschen im Wandel der Zeit
1994	Prof. Dr. Akira Ono	Die Altsteinzeit in Japan
1995	Prof. Dr. Michel Egloff	Jäger des Magdalénien am Ufer des Neuenburger Sees(Schweiz)
1996	Prof. Dr. Jesús Altuna	Siedlungsplätze und Bilderhöhlen des Magdalénien im Iberischen Baskenland
1997	Prof. Dr. Francis Clark Howell	Ein halbes Jahrhundert Paläoanthropologie. Ein persönliches Resümee
1998	Dr. Karel Valoch	Das Magdalénien in Mähren
1999	Prof. Dr. Pablo Arias Cabal	La Garma (Kantabrien/Spanien) - Außergewöhnliche eiszeitliche Malereien und Befunde in einer verschlossenen Höhle
2000	Dr. Bernhard Gramsch	Friesack: Letzte Jäger und Sammler in der Mark Brandenburg
2001	Prof. Dr. Nicholas Conard	Die Neandertaler am Rhein
2002	PD Dr. Michael Baales	Vulkanismus und Archäologie des Eiszeitalters am Mittelrhein: Ergebnisse 30jähriger Forschungsarbeit
2003	Prof. Dr. Gerhard Bosinski	Gönnersdorf – Eiszeitjäger am Mittelrhein
2004	Prof. Dr. Sabine Gaudzinski	Die ersten Menschen am See Genezareth - die Ausgrabungen am israelischen Fundplatz 'Ubeidija
2005	Prof. Dr. Friedemann Schrenk	Auf der Suche nach Adam
2006	Prof. Dr. Ralf W. Schmitz	Neandertal 1856-2006
2007	PD Dr. Harald Floss	Vom Vogelherd zur Grotte Chauvet – Die Anfänge der Eiszeitkunst in Europa
2008	Dr. Christine Neugebauer-Maresch	Krems an der Donau in Niederösterreich – Zentrum altsteinzeitlichen Lebens – Zentrum neuer Entdeckungen
2009	Prof. Dr. Klaus Schmidt	Göbekli Tepe – Ein steinzeitliches Bergheiligtum in der Südosttürkei
2010	Prof. Dr. Jürgen Richter	Savannenmenschen in der Mammutsteppe? - Wege des Homo sapiens von Afrika nach Europa
2011	Dr. Peter Vang Petersen	Jagd und Musik in der nordeuropäischen Mittelsteinzeit
2012	Prof. Dr. Klaus-Joachim Kind	Auf der Suche nach dem Löwenmenschen. Die älteste Kunst der Menschheit
2013	Prof. Jean-Jacques Hublin	Aufstieg und Niedergang der Neandertaler
2014	Prof. David Lordkipanidze	Die ersten Menschen außerhalb Afrikas
2016	Prof. Clive Gamble	1859: im Augenblick der Zeit – Der Beginn einer neuen Wissenschaft der Vorgeschichte
