= Paul Klimsch =

German painter (1868–1917

- Born: Paul Hans Klimsch; 15 June 1868; Frankfurt, Germany
- Died: 4 June 1917 (aged 48); Frankfurt, Germany
- Education: Academy of Fine Arts, Karlsruhe
- Known for: Painting
- Style: Landscapes; Animals
- Movement: Impressionism
- Relatives: Fritz Klimsch (brother)

Hans Paul Klimsch (15 June 1868 in Frankfurt – 4 June 1917) was a German Impressionist painter and illustrator, best known for his landscapes and animals. He was one of the foremost representatives in Germany of the plein air style.

== Biography ==
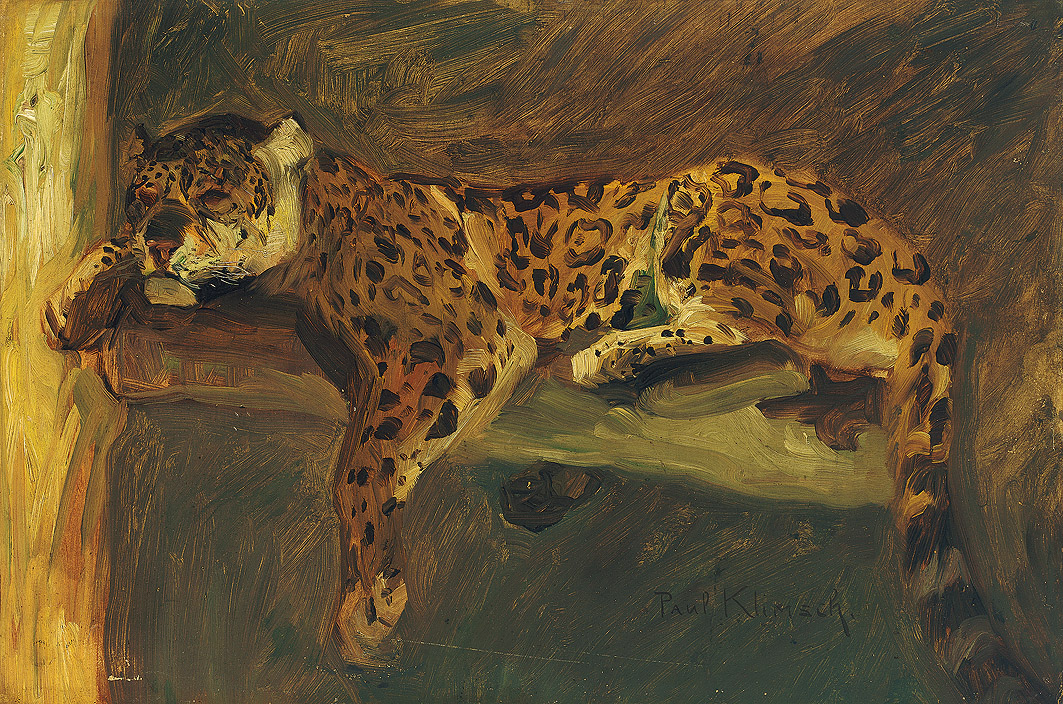
Sleeping Jaguar

Paul Klimsch's family founded the engineering company Klimsch & Co. His parents were the artist Eugen Johann Georg Klimsch and Anna Helena Burkhard. His younger brother Fritz Klimsch became a sculptor.

Klimsch moved to Karlsruhe in 1886, where he studied under Ernst Schurth and Hermann Baisch at the Academy of Fine Arts. In 1891 he finished his studies, moving to Munich a year later, where he studied under René Reinicke until 1900. Once back in Frankfurt, Klimsch lived in Sachsenhausen-Nord, but was often in Berlin, where he became a member of the Berlin Secession, and participated in numerous exhibitions, including those of 1909, 1911 and 1912. Max Liebermann and Heinrich Zille belonged to his circle of friends. With Max Slevogt he visited the Frankfurt Zoo for painting. The early membership of Klimsch in the Deutscher Künstlerbund is documented in the membership list of 1906; he was also member of the Frankfurt-Cronberger-Künstler-Bund. In 1922 the Art Institute of Chicago showed his works in The Second International Exhibition.
