= Fritz Klimsch =

German sculptor

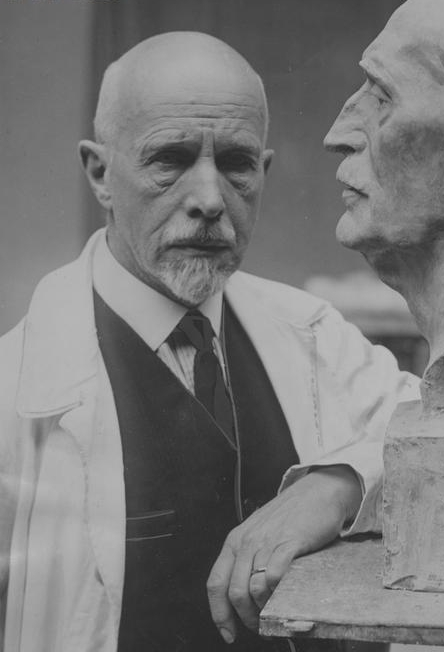
- Klimsch in 1940
- Born: 10 February 1870; Frankfurt am Main, Kingdom of Prussia
- Died: 30 March 1960 (aged 90); Freiburg im Breisgau, West Germany
- Known for: Sculpture
- Relatives: Paul Klimsch (brother)

Fritz Klimsch (10 February 1870 – 30 March 1960) was a German sculptor, and the younger brother of the painter Paul Klimsch. He was one of the famous artists in the era of Weimar republic.

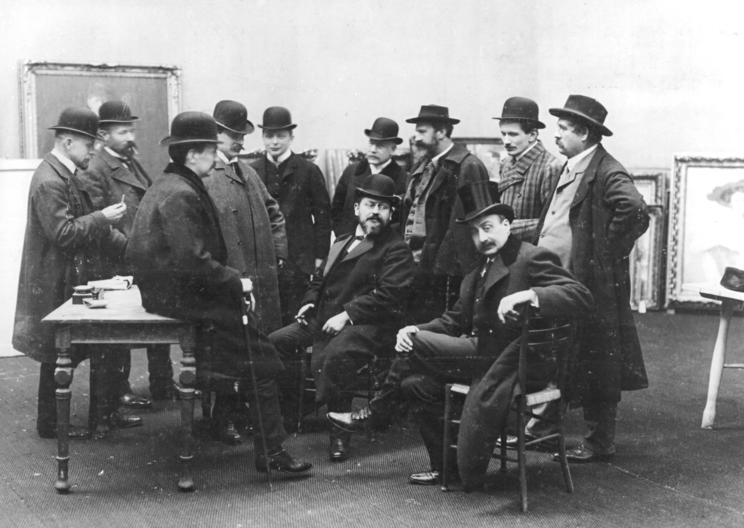
Jury for the Berlin Secession 1908 exhibition. From the left: sculptors Fritz Klimsch and August Gaul, painters Walter Leistikow and Hans Baluschek, art dealer Paul Cassirer, painters Max Slevogt (sitting) and George Mosson (standing), sculptor Max Kruse, painters Max Liebermann (sitting), Emil Rudolf Weiss and Lovis Corinth.

== Early life ==
Klimsch was born on 10 February 1870 in Frankfurt am Main to a family of artists, studying at the Royal College for the Academic Fine Arts in Berlin, and was then a student of Fritz Schaper. In 1898, Klimsch was a founding member of the Berlin Secession. His work was also part of the sculpture event in the art competition at the 1936 Summer Olympics.

== Career ==
After the seizure of power by the Nazis, official commissions such as busts of Adolf Hitler, Erich Ludendorff and Wilhelm Frick, among others, were predominant. According to a diary entry by Joseph Goebbels, Klimsch was "the most mature of our sculptors. A genius." In September 1944, Goebbels added Klimsch to the Gottbegnadeten list, a list of prominent artists considered crucial to Nazi Culture, one of only 12 visual artists to be featured on the list. After Nazi Germany's defeat in World War II, Klimsch and his family settled in Salzburg, Austria, but in 1946 was deported by the local burgermeister, Richard Hildmann, for being a German citizen. The family moved to Freiburg im Breisgau, in Baden-Württemberg, West Germany. Although Klimsch was never a member of the Nazi Party, being honored by the Nazi regime made him a controversial post-war figure, and led to his expulsion from the academy of the arts in 1955. However, shortly before his death in 1960, Klimsch received the Federal Cross of Merit from Hans Filbinger, the Minister President of Baden-Württemberg, on his 90th birthday.

== Death ==
Kilmsch died on 30 March 1960 in Freiburg im Breisgau, and was buried in Saig bei Lenzkirch, where he was an honorary citizen.

== Gallery ==
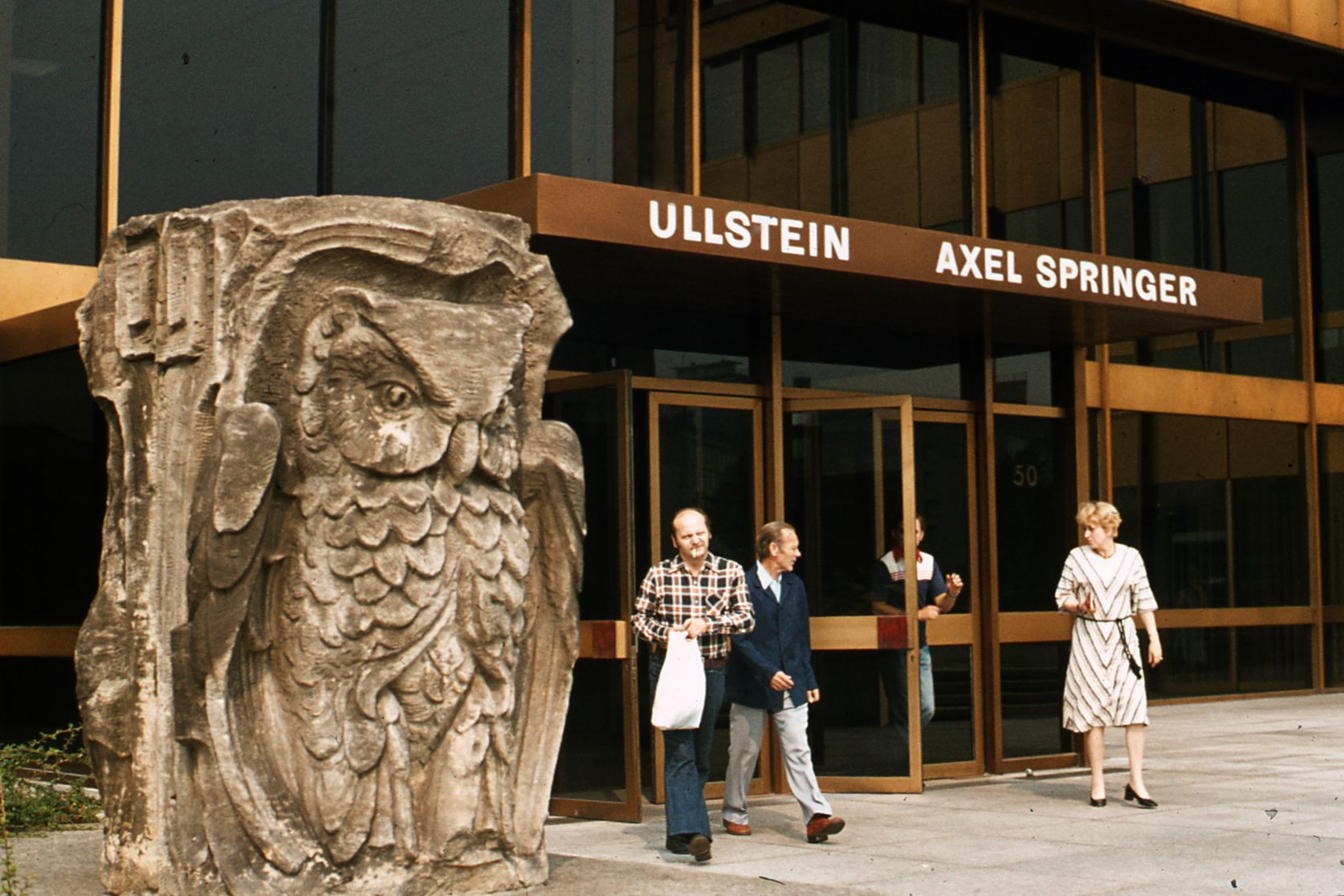
Front entrance to the Axel Springer SE headquarters building in West Berlin, 1977, with the Fritz Klimsch owl sculpture

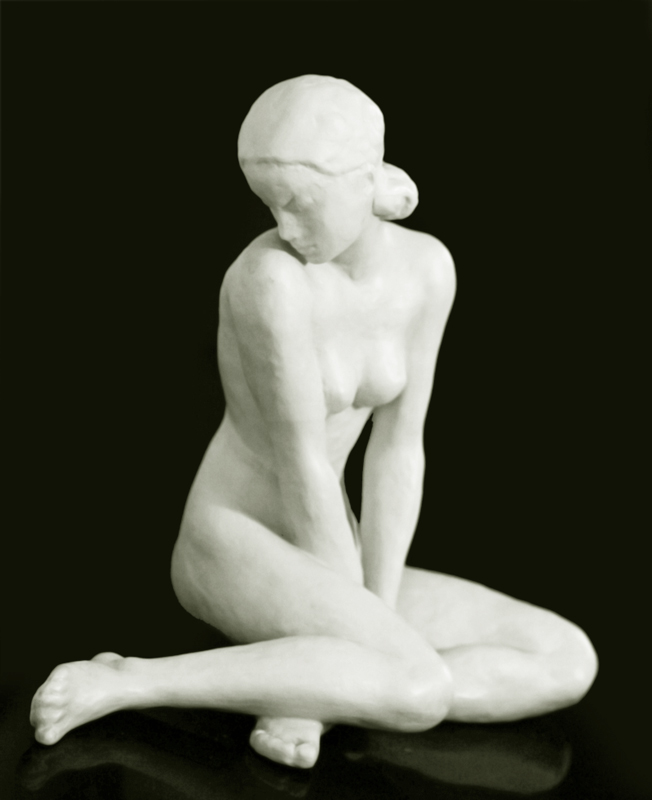
Fritz Klimsch, a female nude

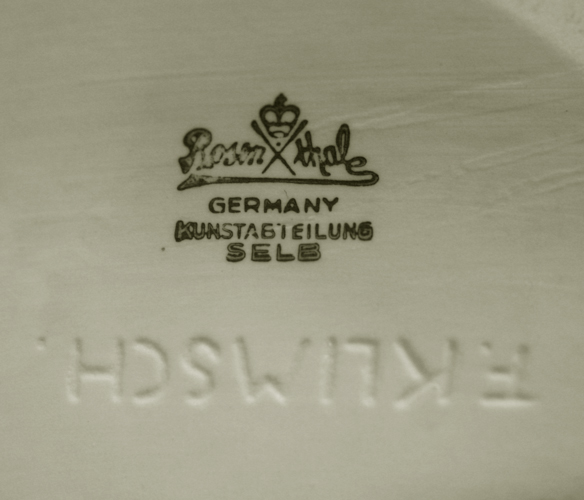
Fritz Klimsch, factory mark

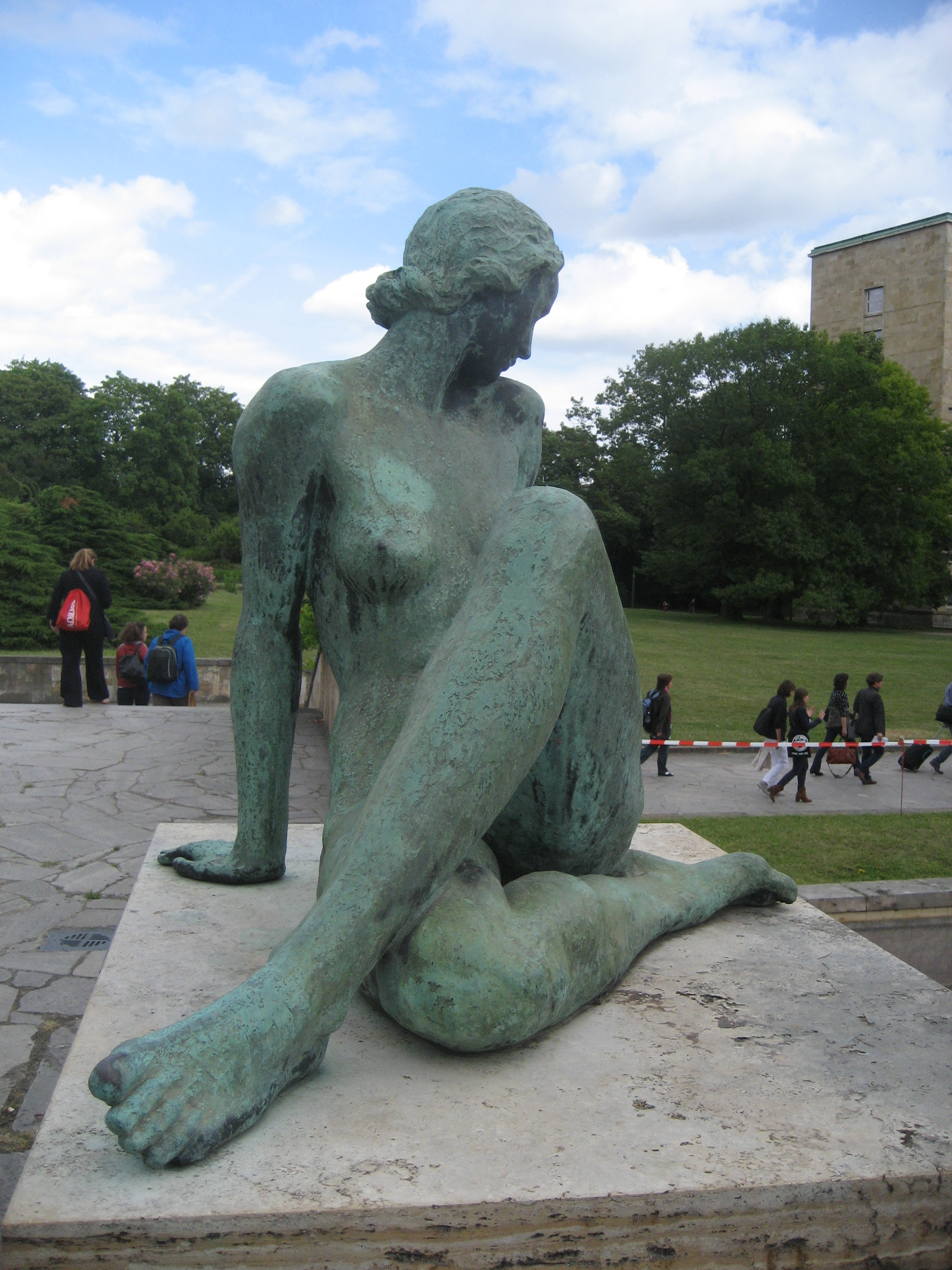
Nymph by the water (Frankfurt am Main)

== See also ==
- Rudolf Virchow Monument
