= Leibniz-Zentrum für Archäologie =

Archaeological research institute and museum in Mainz

Coordinates: 50°0′22″N 8°16′11″E

Leibniz Centre for Archaeology
- Leibniz-Zentrum für Archäologie
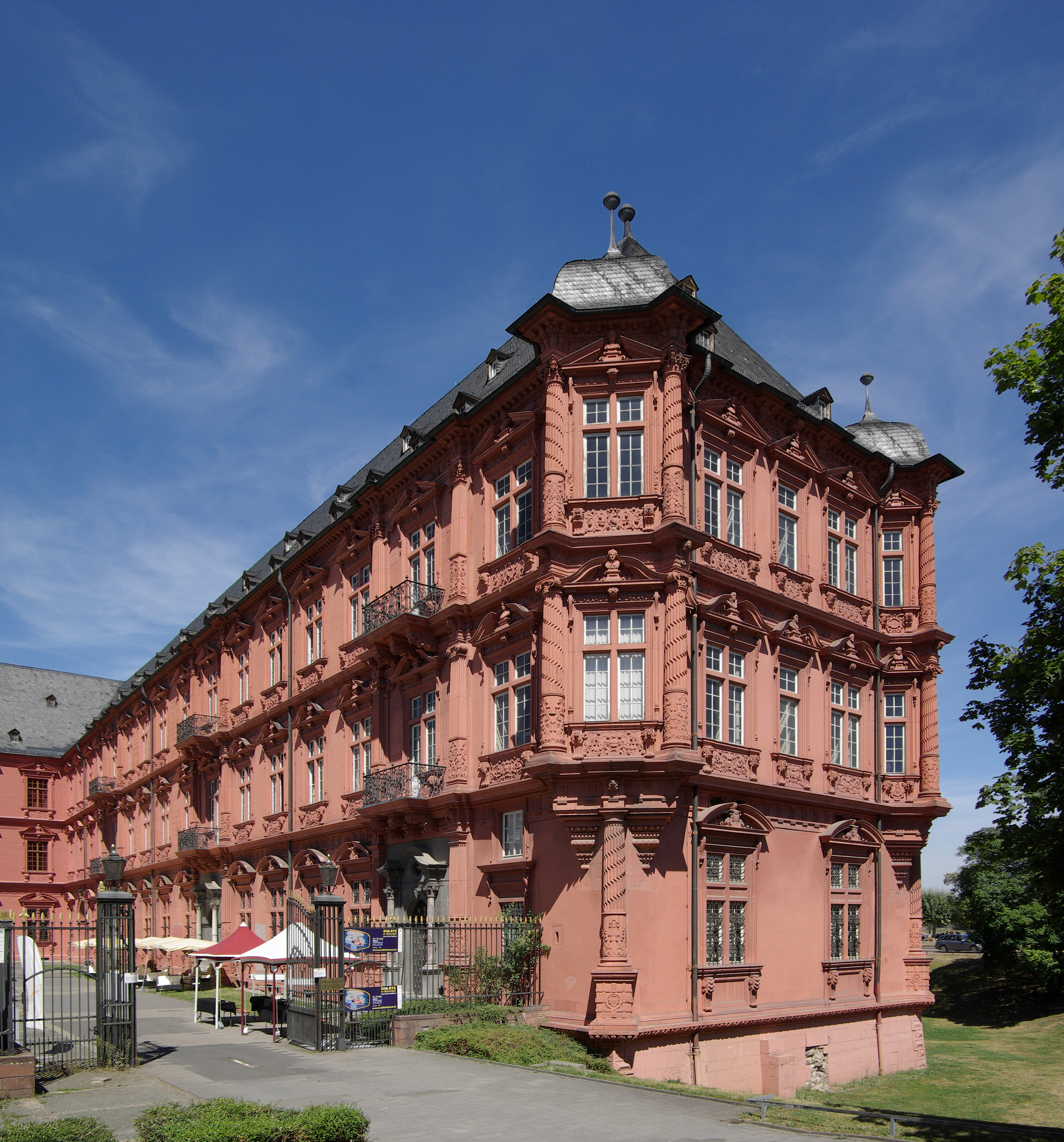
- The Electoral Palace, site of 3 divisions of the Römisch-Germanisches Zentralmuseum
- Former name: Römisch-Germanisches Zentralmuseum (lit. Romano-Germanic Central Museum)
- Established: 1852
- Location: Mainz, Germany
- Collection size: The Old World and its contact zones from the Stone Age to the Middle Ages
- Director: Alexandra W. Busch
- Website: http://web.rgzm.de/

Commonly abbreviated to LEIZA, the Leibniz Centre for Archaeology (German: Leibniz-Zentrum für Archäologie) is an archaeological and anthropological research institute and museum headquartered in Mainz. It is supported by the federal government of Germany and its states and is a member of the Leibniz Association — a consortium of German research institutions. Prior to 2023, it was known since its founding as the Romano-Germanic Central Museum (German: Römisch-Germanisches Zentralmuseum)

The institution studies the Old World and its contact zones from the Stone Age to the Middle Ages. It consists of several divisions, and in addition maintains a permanent collection and through this and its numerous publications and conferences, disseminates the findings of recent research to the public.

== History ==
The museum was founded in 1852 1852 by Ludwig Lindenschmit the Elder as the Römisch-Germanisches Zentralmuseum, after the decision was taken at the 16–19 August Versammlung deutscher Geschichts- und Alterthumsforscher (Assembly of German Researchers in History and Classical Studies) in Dresden that a "central museum for Germanic and Roman artifacts" should be founded in Mainz and a "Germanic museum" should be founded in Nuremberg (the Germanisches Nationalmuseum). It was no accident that the museum was established in the city of Mainz, with its high importance in the Middle Ages, and housed in the Electoral Palace; rather these decisions symbolised the museum's national aspirations in the era of the German Confederation.

In the early years of its existence, the museum faced considerable financial and organisational problems: the support which had been promised by the historical association failed to materialise, and instead the Nuremberg museum was promised exclusivity and the governing board of the Mainz museum were pressured to amalgamate with it. Only after the foundation of the German Empire in 1871 did the museum receive an annual budget, which also made it possible for Lindenschmit to make his work there his primary pursuit; until then, he had also worked as a drawing teacher. After his death, his son Ludwig Lindenschmit the Younger took over the leadership.

In 1900 Karl Schumacher became the first director of the museum, a position which he would hold for 25 years. He increased its size from four to 27 rooms of exhibits, had further copies and reconstructions created in the museum's own workshop and published 297 works under his own name in addition to numerous catalogues, in particular the three-volume Siedlungs- und Kulturgeschichte der Rheinlande.

The elder Lindenschmit conceived of the museum as a research collection of copies, which would include all significant finds made in Germany, or even the whole of Europe, in order to facilitate comparative studies. The museum in Mainz still has the character of a research collection, aimed more at scholars and those interested in the field than at the public in general. In recent years, the museum has also offered "programmes for instructors" and special exhibitions devoted to current research. Although the institution has at times also taken some responsibility for heritage preservation in Rhenish Hesse, including conducting their own excavations, the restoration workshops still constitute today the foundation of their scholarly work, while field investigations are primarily conducted by the annexes in Neuwied and Mayen.

In early December 2007, the museum announced plans for a new building on the southern edge of Mainz, next to the Museum of Ancient Seafaring which is one of its annexes.

Some major German archaeologists have worked and work at the Römisch-Germanisches Zentralmuseum, including Ludwig Lindenschmit the Younger, Paul Reinecke, Friedrich Behn, Kurt Böhner, Konrad Weidemann, Markus Egg and Falko Daim. Alexandra W. Busch has been Director General since October 2018.

== Name change ==
On 1 January 2023, following a three-month move from the Kurfürstliches Schloss to a new purpose-built facility in Mainz, the institute changed its name from Römisch-Germanisches Zentralmuseum (RGZM) to Leibniz-Zentrum für Archäologie (LEIZA). The new centre was formally opened on 24 March 2023.

== Research emphases ==
Researchers from different divisions work together on emphasised themes which cross boundaries between divisions and periods:

- Early hominid expansions and the colonisation of western Eurasia (e.g., excavation of the find of homo georgicus at Dmanisi in Georgia)
- Studies on the emergence and development of big-game hunting
- Systems of settlement and internal organisation of settlements in the Paleolithic and Mesolithic
- Mediterranean traditions in shipbuilding in Western, Central and Northern Europe
- Forms of Romanisation in the northern border provinces of the Roman Empire, from Britannia to the Black Sea
- Studies in the structure and genesis of elites in prehistoric and early societies
- Prehistoric and early historical hoards
- The development of an industrial landscape
- The ancient quarrying and mining region between the Eifel and the Rhine
- Transformation and cultural exchange on the fringes of the Mediterranean world

In presenting research, the museum works closely with the Volcano Park in Mayen-Koblenz. One emphasis is research into the use of volcanic rock as building materials and for millstones, particularly in the Roman period. Rock from the Eastern Eifel was used to build the Roman settlement of Colonia Ulpia Traiana at Xanten and was exported as far as southern Scandinavia.

The museum forms part of the Research Centre for Earth System Disciplines founded in 2008 at the University of Mainz, and of Byzantine Archaeology Mainz, which takes up themes of modern interdisciplinary inquiry into the archaeological evidence on the Byzantine Empire.

== Research divisions ==
The Römisch-Germanisches Zentralmuseum has several divisions and annexes. The Electoral Palace in Mainz houses three divisions:

- Prehistory
- Roman provincial archaeology
- Early Middle Ages

Several research areas are attached to these divisions.

In the Museum of Ancient Seafaring in Mainz:

- Research area: ancient seafaring

In Castle Monrepos at Neuwied, the Museum of Ice Age Archaeology:

- Research area: Old Stone Age

In Mayen:

- Research area: Volcanology, Archaeology, History of Technology

The Römisch-Germanisches Zentralmuseum also currently has an extension programme in China.

=== Restoration workshops ===
The work of the Römisch-Germanisches Zentralmuseum is focussed more on artifacts than on conducting field research. This has come to be so because of the museum's rich tradition and important work in restoration workshops; amongst others, they have worked on Ötzi the Iceman's equipment and the bronze boar from Soulac-sur-Mer. They also train restorers, and a BA degree in museum restoration is offered jointly with the University of Mainz. At the request of the State of Rhineland-Palatinate, the museum and the university have also jointly set up a centre for mineralogical archaeometry and conservation studies.

== Publications ==
The museum's history of publications in the field of archaeology goes back to 1852. They publish several scholarly journals, since 2006 in cooperation with Schnell und Steiner in Regensburg.

- Archäologisches Korrespondenzblatt
- Jahrbuch des RGZM (yearbook)
- Kataloge Vor- und Frühgeschichtlicher Altertümer (catalogues of pre-historic and early antiquities; volume 40 published in 2007; part 2 of volume 30 published in 2009)
- Corpus Signorum Imperii Romani (first published 1964)
- Tagungen des RGZM (symposia)
- Exhibition catalogues
- Restaurierung und Archäologie (journal, first published 2008)
- Museum guide (first published 2008)

Additionally, they publish scholarly monographs and a recently instituted series for a popular readership.

== Exhibits ==
- Museum of Ice Age Archaeology
- Museum of Ancient Seafaring
- Volcano Park, Mayen-Koblenz

The museum in the Electoral Palace has been closed since autumn 2017. The new permanent exhibition is expected to reopen in 2021 in a new building in the southern part of Mainz.

In addition, the museum participates in international exhibitions, but there is rarely space to display these at Mainz.

== See also ==
- Rudolf Virchow lecture
