= Venous stasis =

Slow blood flow through the veins, usually in the legs

- Other names: Venostasis
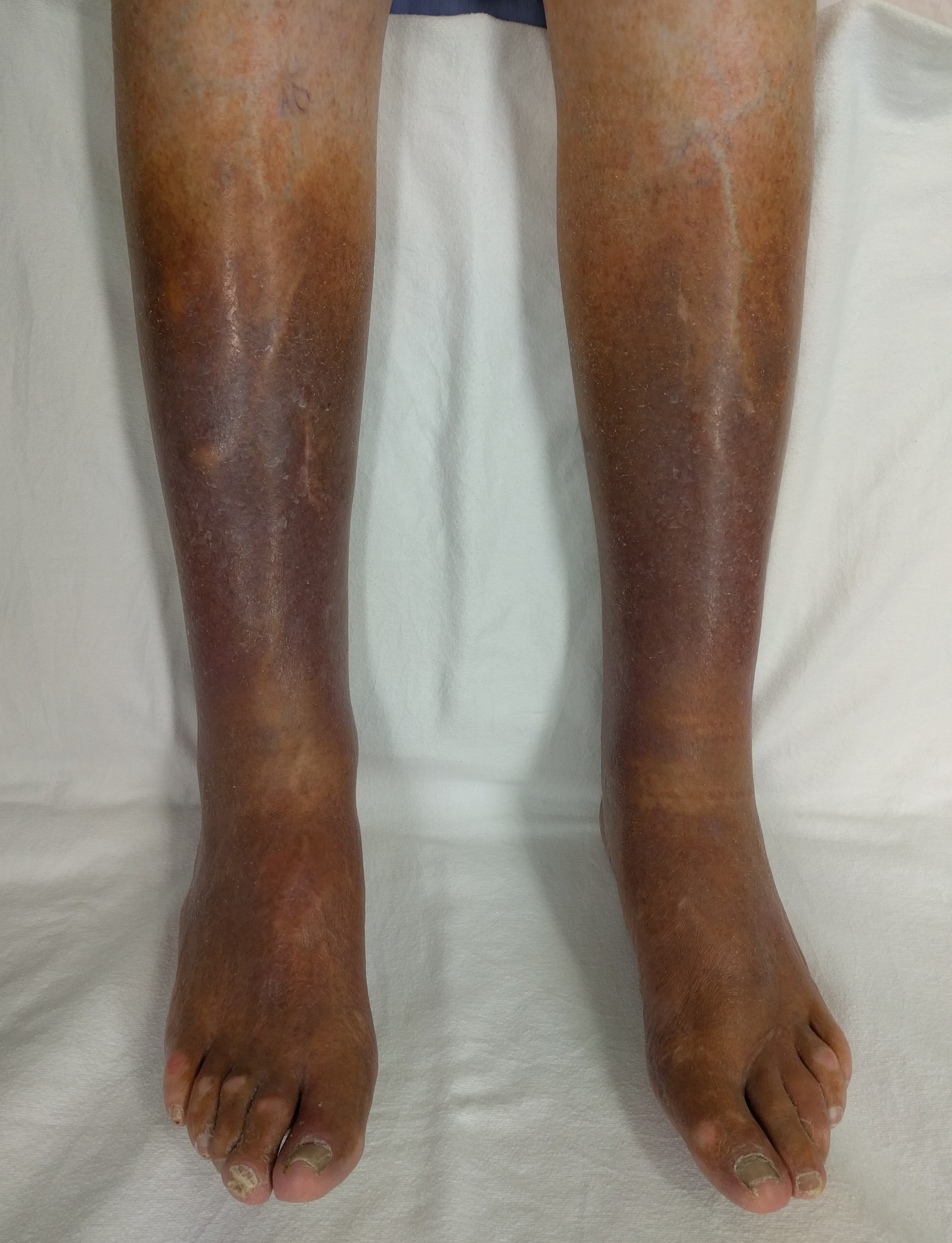
- Skin changes as a result of long term venous stasis

Venous stasis, or venostasis, is a condition of slow blood flow in the veins, usually of the legs.

== Presentation ==
=== Complications ===
Potential complications of venous stasis are:

- Venous ulcers
- Blood clot formation in veins (venous thrombosis), that can occur in the deep veins of the legs (deep vein thrombosis, DVT) or in the superficial veins
- Id reactions

== Causes ==
Causes of venous stasis include:

- Obesity
- Pregnancy
- Previous damage to leg
- Blood clot
- Smoking
- Swelling and inflammation of a vein close to the skin
- Congestive heart failure.
- Long periods of immobility that can be encountered from driving, flying, bed rest/hospitalization, or having an orthopedic cast. Recommendations by clinicians to reduce venous stasis and DVT/PE often encourage increasing walking, calf exercises, and intermittent pneumatic compression when possible.
- Weakened Venous valves: these are crucial towards ensuring upward flow to the heart from the lower extremities. If weakened, they may fail to close properly which leads to backwards blood flow/blood pooling. This can lead to slower blood flow in the veins.

Ultrasonography-Doppler ultrasound

== See also ==
- Virchow's triad
