= Ulcerative dermatitis =

- Specialty: Dermatology

Ulcerative dermatitis is a skin disorder in rodents associated with bacterial growth often initiated by self-trauma due to a possible allergic response. Although other organisms can be involved, bacteria culture frequently shows Staphylococcus aureus. Primarily found on the rib cage, neck, and shoulder, lesions are often irregular, circumscribed, and moist. Intense itching may lead to scratching which may aggravate and perpetuate the lesion. Destruction of the epidermis along with underlying pustules or abscesses, and granulomatous inflammation, may be present. In cases where topical treatment alone does not resolve the dermatitis and irritants are not known, a secondary bacterial, fungal or yeast infection might be present and may require an anti-fungal or antibiotics to be prescribed by the veterinarian to affect a cure.

In rats, this skin disorder may be observed on the neck and head, often secondary to skin trauma from scratches or fighting.

== See also ==
- List of skin diseases
- Skin lesion
- Skin ulcer
