= Martin Brandenburg =

German painter (1870–1919)

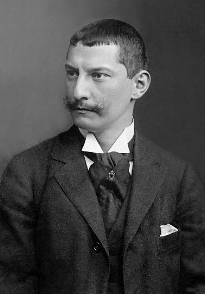
Martin Brandenburg (1900), photograph by Wilhelm Fechner

Martin Brandenburg (8 May 1870 in Posen – 19 February 1919 in Stuttgart) was a German Impressionist painter, draftsman and graphic artist, best known for his landscapes filled with fantastical figures.

== Life ==
From 1889 to 1892, he studied at the Prussian Academy of Art then, from 1894 to 1895 in Paris. He first came to public notice through an exhibition held in the Fritz Gurlitt Salon, Berlin.

In 1897, he joined a local secessionist society known as the "Vereinigung der XI" and the following year became a member of the Berlin Secession. He was a good friend of the Realist painter, Hans Baluschek. In 2017, the Bröhan Museum presented a joint exhibition of their works.

From 1908 to 1918, he taught a class for young women at the Studienatelier für Malerei und Plastik, also known as the "Lewin-Funcke Schule", after its founder, the sculptor Arthur Lewin-Funcke. Among his best-known students there were the textile designer Anni Albers and the painter Irma Stern. In 1906, he was one of the artists selected by the Stollwerck chocolate company to create new trading cards for inclusion in their products. He produced designs for their Collector Scrapbooks numbers 9 and 10.

He was also a member of the Deutscher Künstlerbund and exhibited with them at the Große Berliner Kunstausstellung in 1914. His works have occasionally been compared to those of Max Beckmann.
