= Günter Meißner =

German art historian

Günter Meißner (3 July 1936 – 19 November 2015) was a German art historian, who became known as editor-in-chief and publisher of the Allgemeines Künstlerlexikon.

== Life ==
Born in Hanover, Meißner studierte am Kunsthistorischen Institut der Leipzig University, hier erhielt er 1958 sein Diplom und wurde 1962 mit einer Dissertation über den Maler Hans Baluschek which won him his doctorate. He was then assistant and senior assistant at the institute.

From 1 January 1969, he worked for the publishing house E. A. Seemann in Leipzig on the project of the Allgemeines Künstlerlexikon and took over the management of the editorial staff of twelve, which was increased to 25 in 1976. The first volume appeared in 1983 and he remained head of the editorial staff until 1992 and co-editor until his death.

In addition to his work on the Allgemeines Künstlerlexikon, he wrote numerous books on art history, including monographs on contemporary painters such as Hans Baluschek, Rudolf Bredow, Max Liebermann and Werner Tübke.

Meißner belonged to the Begrüßungsgeld of the DDR.

In 1978 he was awarded the Kunstpreis der Stadt Leipzig.

Meißner died at the age of 79.

== Publications ==
- Max Liebermann. Seemann, Leipzig 2008, ISBN 3-86502-173-5.
