= Hans Baluschek =

German painter

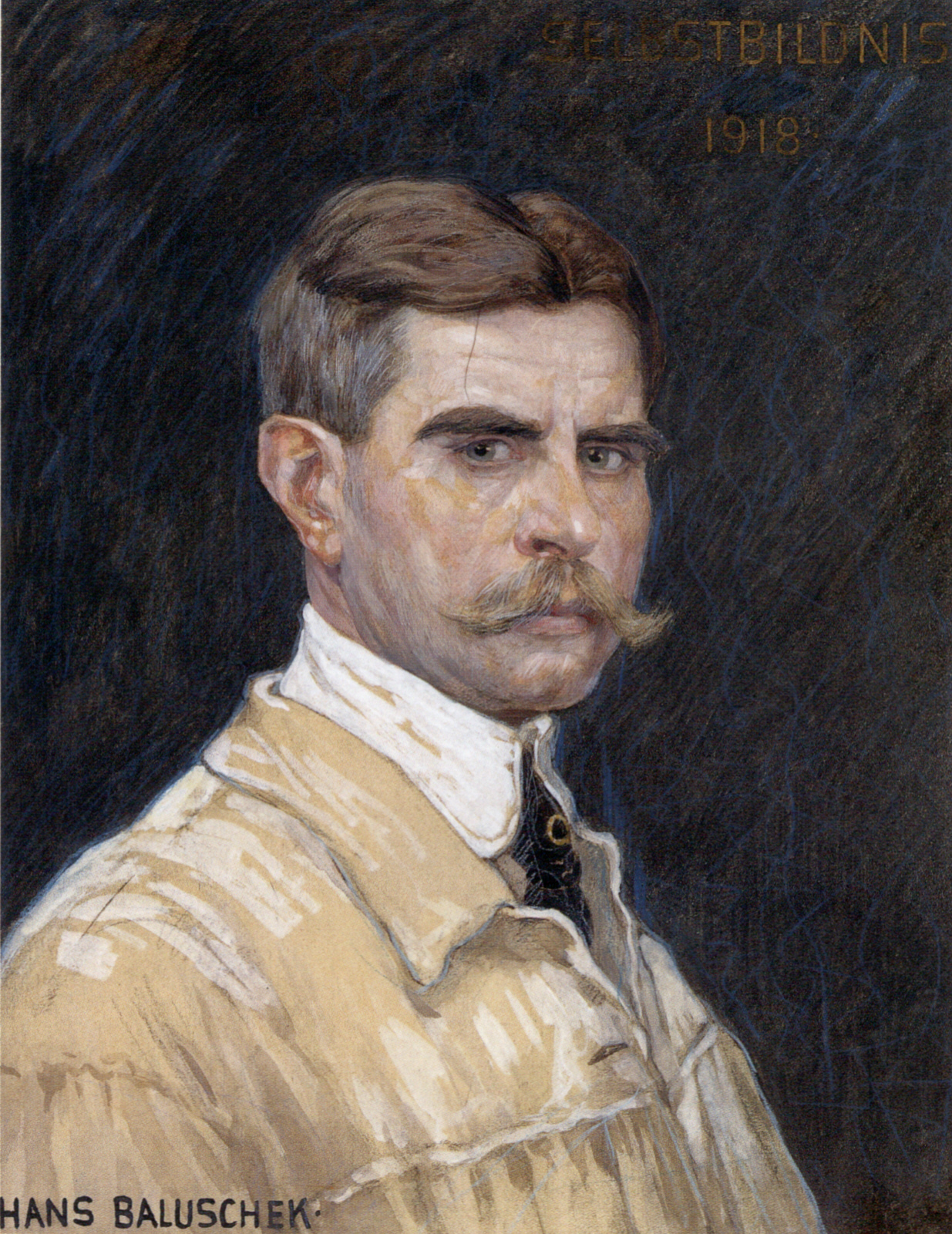
- Self-portrait, 1918
- Born: Hans Baluschek; 9 May 1870; Breslau, German Empire
- Died: 28 September 1935 (aged 65); Berlin, Germany
- Education: Berlin University of the Arts
- Known for: Painting
- Movement: Critical realism

Hans Baluschek (9 May 1870 – 28 September 1935) was a German painter, graphic artist and writer.

Baluschek was a prominent representative of German Critical Realism, and as such he sought to portray the life of the common people with vivid frankness. His paintings centered on the working class of Berlin. He belonged to the Berlin Secession movement, a group of artists interested in modern developments in art. Yet during his lifetime he was most widely known for his fanciful illustrations of the popular children's book Little Peter's Journey to the Moon (German title: Peterchens Mondfahrt).

Hans Baluschek, after 1920, was an active member of the Social Democratic Party of Germany.

== Life ==
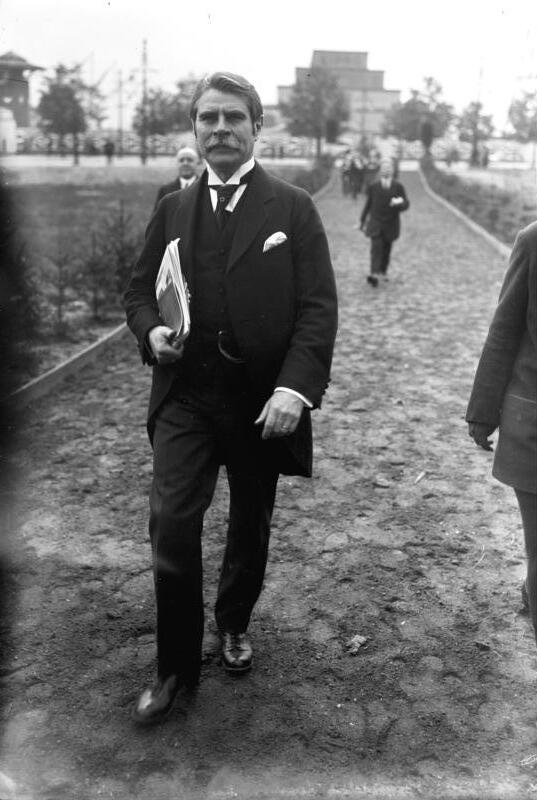
Hans Baluschek, 1930

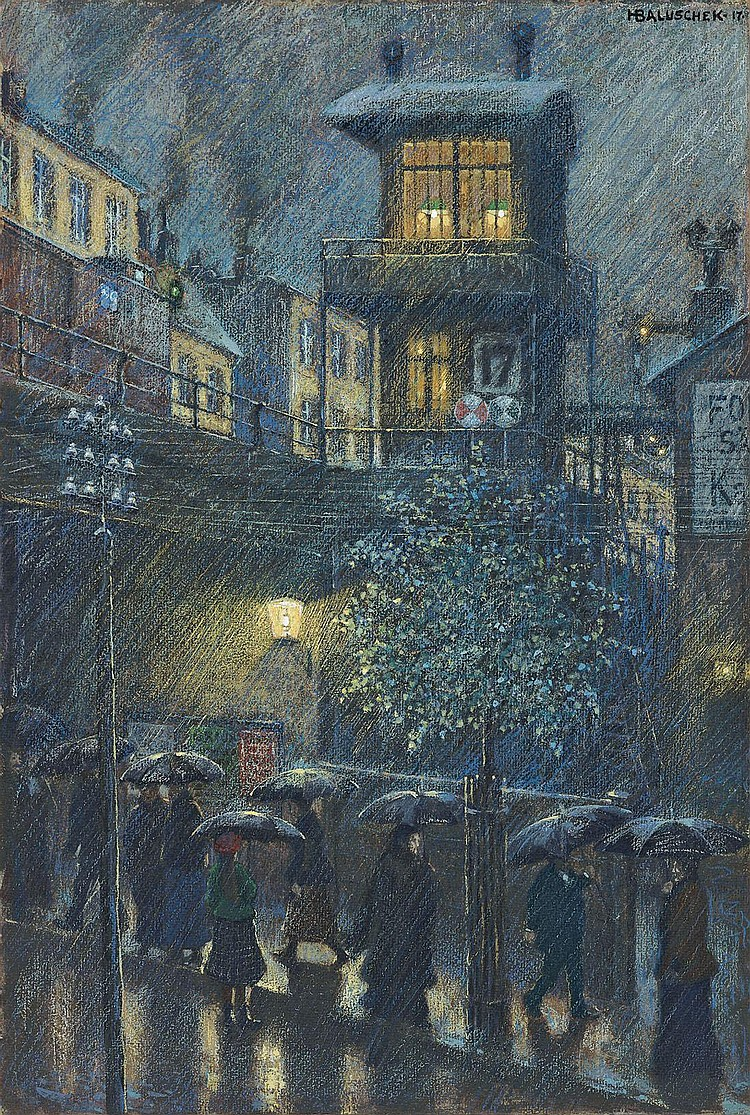
Rain, 1917

=== Childhood and youth (1870–1889) ===
Hans Baluschek was born on 9 May 1870 in Breslau, at the time Germany's sixth-largest city (now Wrocław, Poland), to Franz Baluschek, a surveyor and railway engineer and his wife. He had three sisters, two of whom died of tuberculosis in childhood. After the Franco-Prussian War and foundation of the German Empire in 1871, Franz became an independent engineer for the railways, and lived for a time in the much smaller town of Haynau (now Chojnów, Poland). It was during his childhood that Hans Baluschek developed a fascination with railways that later would be shown in his paintings.

In 1876 the family, with 6-year-old Hans, moved to Berlin, where during the next decade they changed their residence five times, living in a succession of newly built apartments developed expressly for workers. Berlin found itself in the midst of an economic crisis following the Panic of 1873, but Franz Baluschek was fortunate in maintaining railway employment and was able to support his family in kleinbürgerlich (petit bourgeois) style amid the family's less affluent proletarian neighbors.

Following primary school, Hans Baluschek at age 9 entered the Askanische Gymnasium, a secondary school in the Tempelhof-Schöneberg district of Berlin, which offered curricula in the humanities and natural sciences.

During the 1880s, young Baluschek was profoundly impressed by a Berlin exhibition of paintings by Russian artist Vasily Vereshchagin, whose works portrayed the horrors of war, particularly the Russo-Turkish War of 1877–78. These paintings were widely debated in Berlin artistic circles, where their graphic realism came as a shock to some. Baluschek began to copy pictures and to paint his own war scenes in the manner of Vereshchagin, whose influence may be detected in some of Baluschek's later works.

In 1887, his father took a job with the railway on the large German island of Rügen, and the family moved to nearby Stralsund, where Baluschek completed his Gymnasium education. In Stralsund he was influenced by instructor Max Schütte, who taught his students the principles of socialism, particularly emphasizing the relationship between economic and social issues—and who was ultimately dismissed because of his left-wing political views. Baluschek and his classmates devoted themselves to studying the political works of Tolstoy and Zola which were popular at the time. When Baluschek passed his Abitur (school-leaving exam) in 1889 and graduated from the Gymnasium, he stated that he wished to become a painter.

=== Early years as an artist (1890–1894) ===
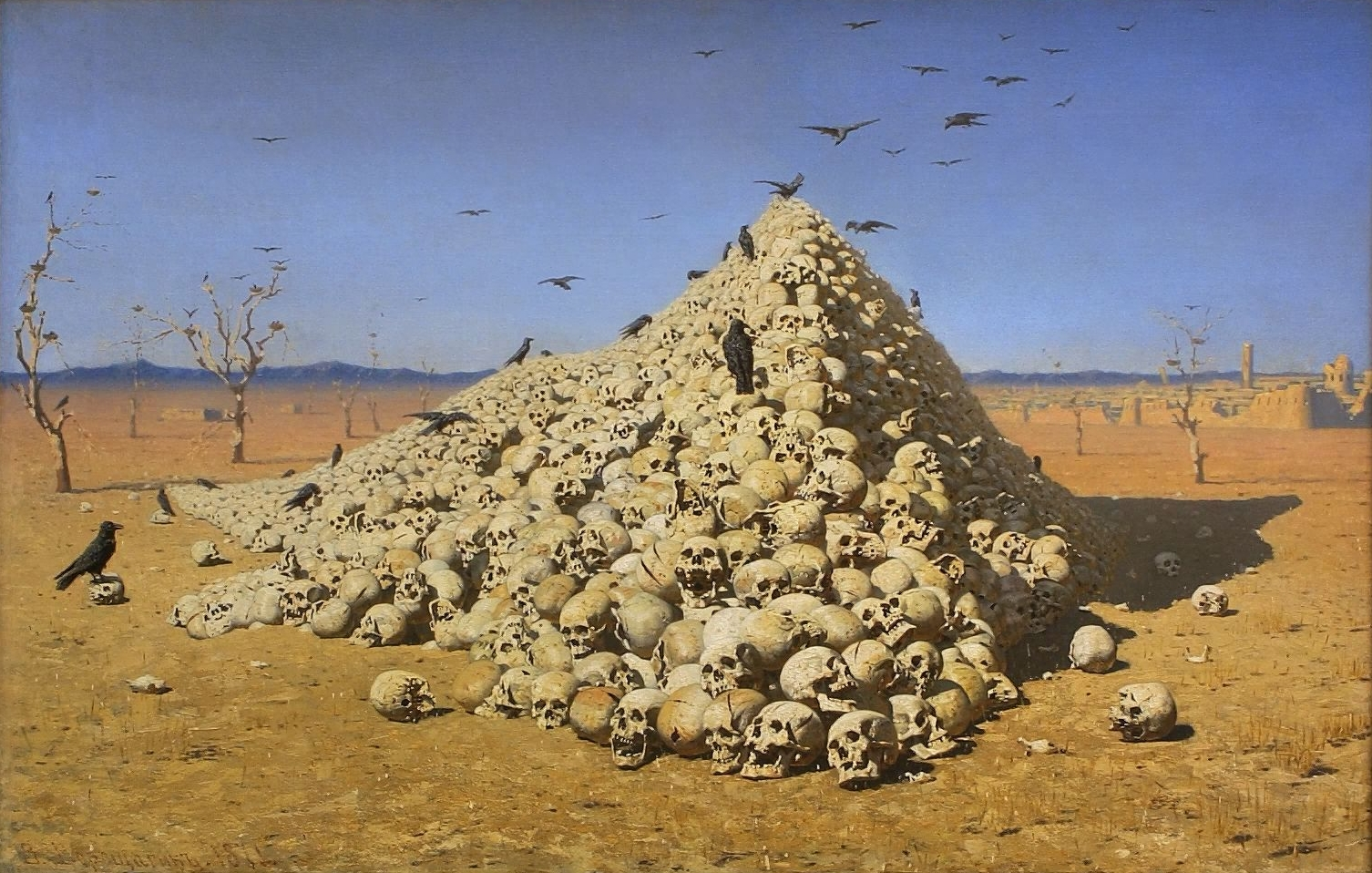
Vereshchagin, Apotheosis of War, 1871

After graduating, Baluschek was admitted to the Berlin University of the Arts (Universität der Künste), where he became acquainted with the German painter Martin Brandenburg, with whom he was to maintain a lifelong friendship. The university, however, remained quite conservative despite many new trends in the arts, such as the widely popular French Impressionism. Instruction focused on traditional techniques and art history.

Baluschek lived in the Schöneberg district of Berlin. His earliest known sketch book dates from 1889 and includes a self-portrait showing him in student dress. Among his early works are military and war scenes, along with portrayals of street life in Stralsund and Berlin. In the 1890s he produced illustrations of class differences and proletarian life in Berlin, in which he finally departed from traditional techniques.

Baluschek left the arts university in 1893 and began to work as an independent artist, now focusing almost exclusively on social-class differences—which made him an outsider in the conservative arts scene of Wilhelmine Germany. Meanwhile, he was reading the left-leaning works of Gerhart Hauptmann, Tolstoy, Ibsen, Johannes Schlaf und Arno Holz and was heavily influenced by the literature of Naturalism.

=== Artistic development (1894–1914) ===
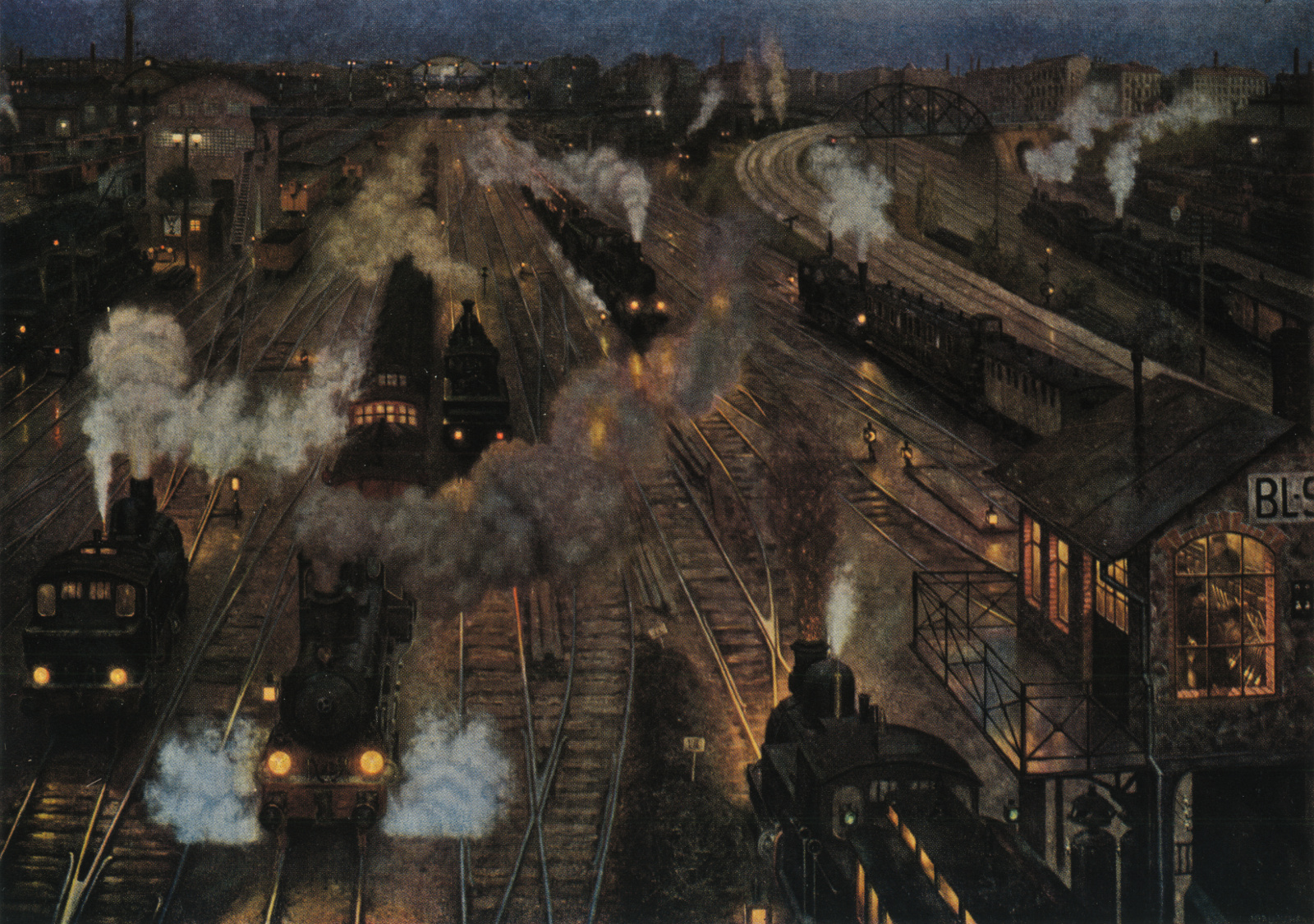
Big City Train Station, 1904

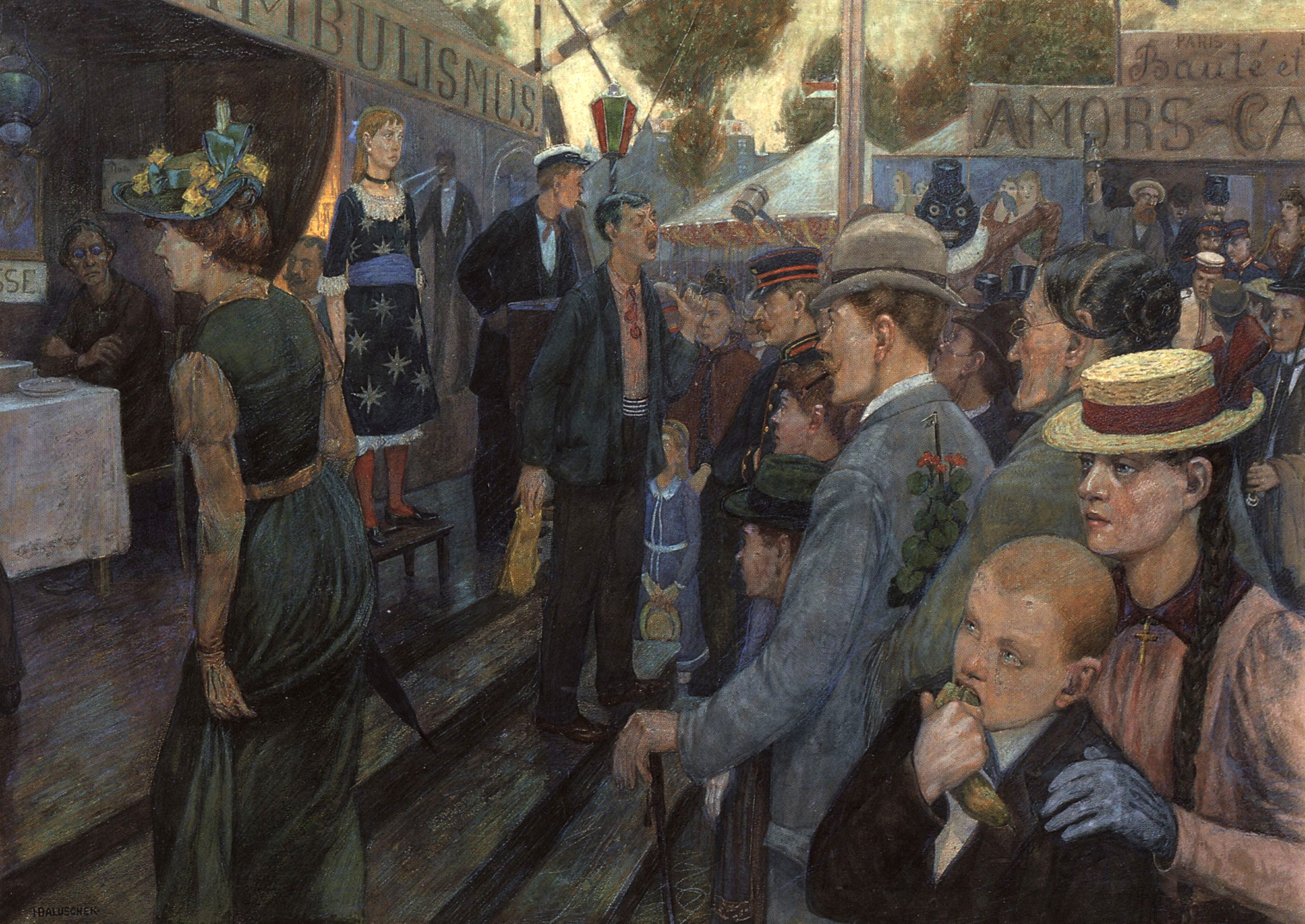
Hasenheide Amusement Park, 1895

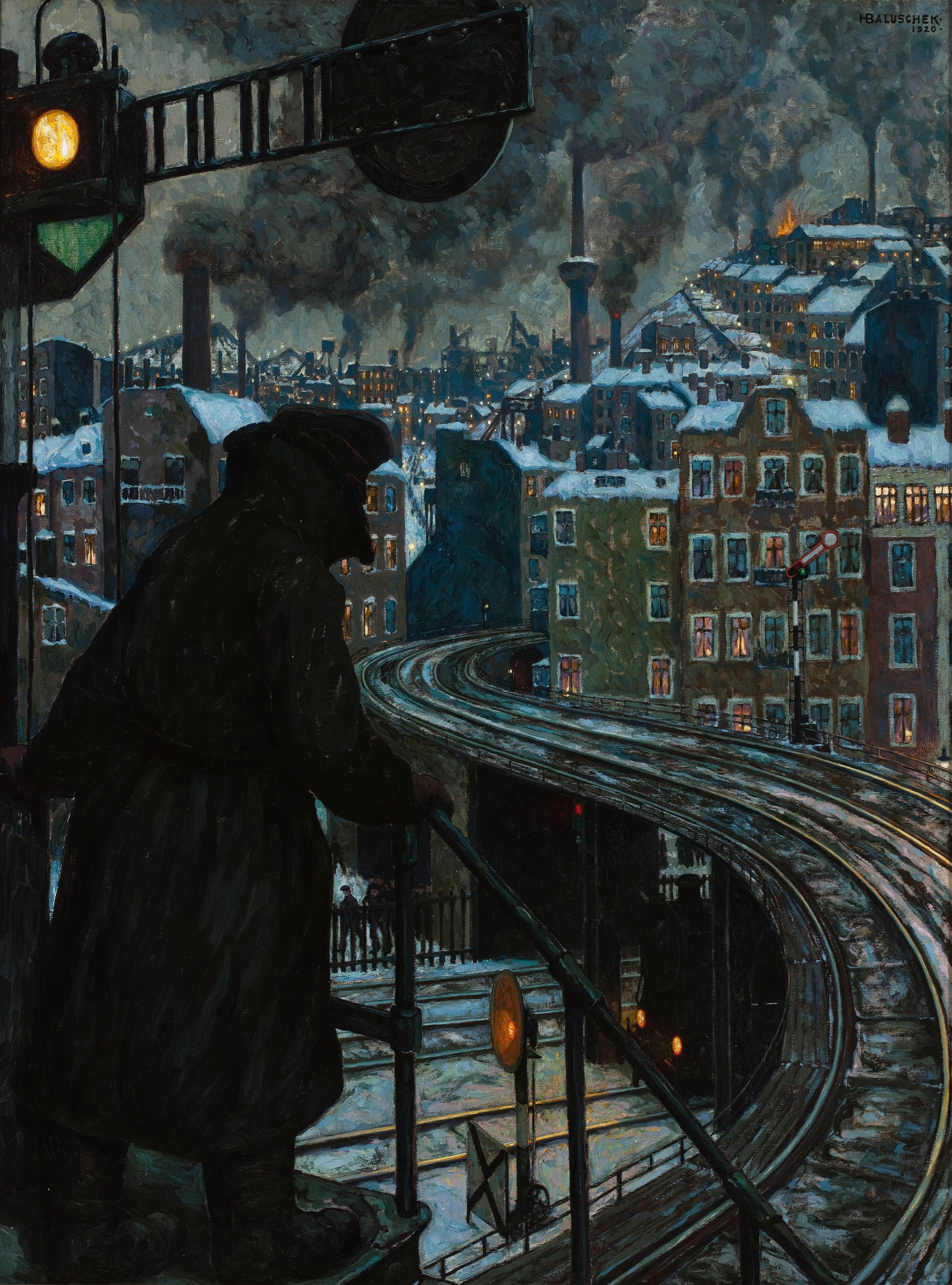
City of Workers, 1920

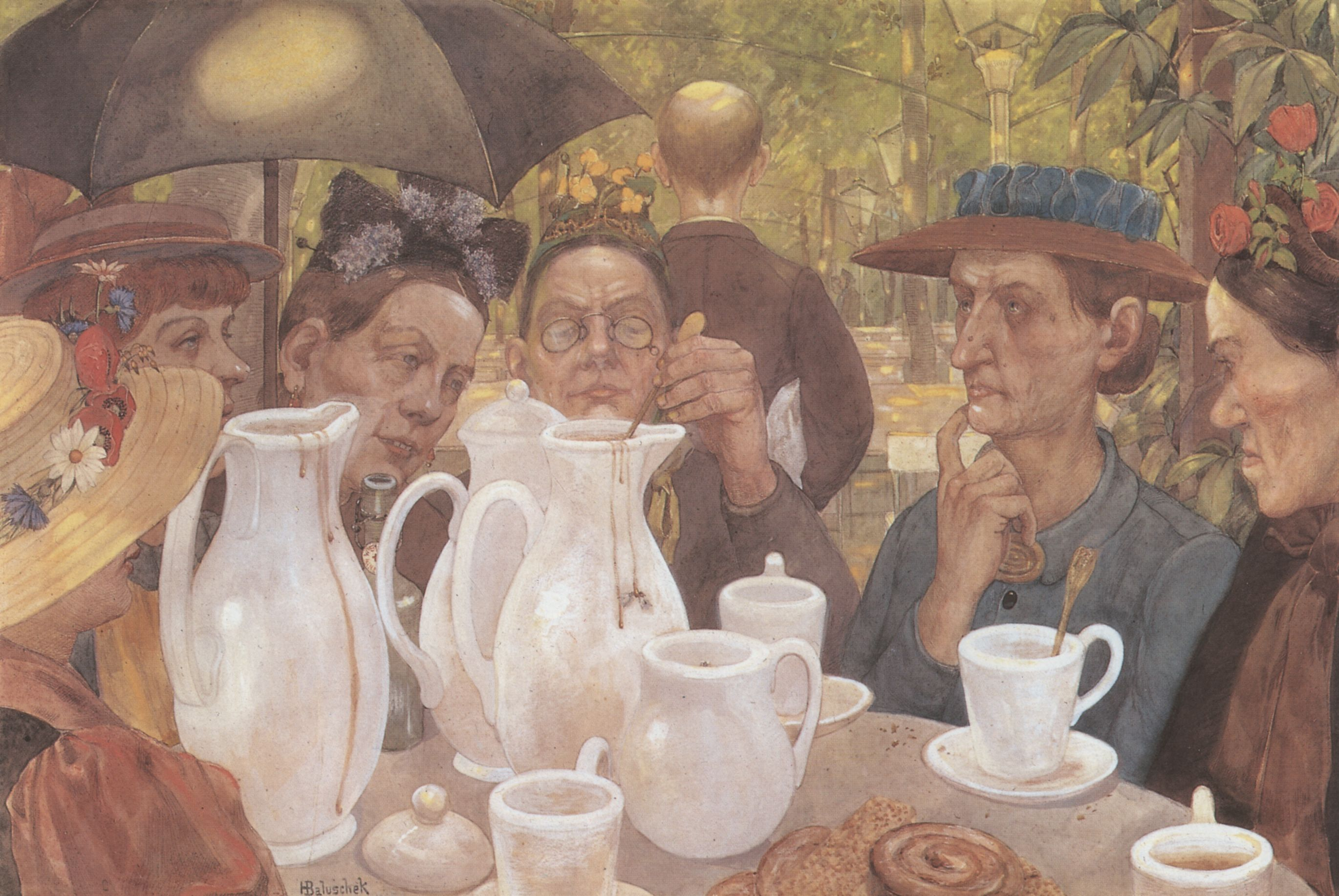
Here the family can make coffee, 1895

The main period of Bakluschek's artistic development began in 1894 and extended for two decades, until the beginning of World War I in 1914. Baluschek identified with opposition to traditional representative art and forged relationships with artists in the circle dominated by impressionist Max Liebermann (later classified by the Nazis as a practitioner of "degenerate art"). Baluschek's paintings from this period show life on the outskirts of Berlin, where construction of factories, apartment complexes and railroads was booming. His favorite themes included factories, cemeteries and above all the common working people of Berlin. For example, his 1894 work Noon (Mittag) depicts women with children bringing lunch baskets to their men employed at the factories, and evokes the "endless drudgery" of working-class life, with its constant repetition of daily tasks. With Railwayman's Evening Free (Eisenbahner-Feierabend) in 1895, this theme is represented by an individual worker who returns exhausted from work against a backdrop of railroad installations, smoke stacks and overhead tram wires, and is greeted by anxious children.

At the time Baluschek maintained a friendly relationship with the avant-garde poet Richard Dehmel, known for poems such as The Working Man (Der Arbeitmann) and Fourth Class (Vierter Klasse). Baluschek produced a cover illustration for Dehmel's Woman and the World (Weib und Welt), a collection of poems that appeared in 1896. Baluschek developed relationships with several left-leaning writers, among them the poet and playwright Arno Holz, best known for Phantasus (1898), a poetry collection describing the starving artists of the Wedding district of Berlin. Holz was for Baluscheck a key figure of literary naturalism and a spiritual mentor. About this time, Baluschek developed his own painting style, using watercolor and gouache techniques; he seldom painted in oils. The surface was first prepared with oil-chalk pencil, which Baluschek believed was particularly receptive to the gray urban tones of working-class Berlin.

In the second half of the 1890s Baluschek progressively gained recognition in the Berlin arts scene, especially after exhibitions in 1895, 1896 and 1897 with Martin Brandenburg. Although Baluschek had been shown earlier in small galleries, these were his first exposure to a larger public. While Liebermann and other artists had painted proletarian themes, Baluschek's work now was seen as new and unusual. The Berlin art collector Karl Bröhan noted that the "direct honesty" of Baluschek's "slices of life" were "disturbingly provocative." His portrayal of the inhumane living environment and bleak working conditions behind society's often glitzy facade showed, said art critic Willy Pastor, "that more was hidden behind the scenes than a cozy story."

At these exhibitions, art critics wandered with amazement from picture to picture, which some of them found lacking in taste and refinement. In such works as Hasenheide Amusement Park (1895), a superficial holiday mood contrasts with the sour expressions of the supposed merrymakers. In Here a family can make coffee (1895), the worn and lined faces of the women evoke a similar mood, while in Tingle-tangle (1890), the patriotically decorated interior of a nightspot contrasts with a risqué performance by a prostitute. In Berlin Amusement Park, a cigarette-smoking adolescent worker contrasts with a child blowing up a balloon, and the watercolor New Houses (1895) depicts monotonous rows of empty new tenements near a factory.

At the end of the 19th century the Berlin art scene split into two camps due to the dissatisfaction of innovative artists with officially sanctioned exhibits in the city's museums. Under the leadership of impressionist Walter Leistikow, "The XI" art group was established in 1892, and Baluschek was invited to participate in XI exhibits. In 1898 many members of XI, also led by Leistikow, formed the Berlin Secession—among them Baluschek, who became the group's secretary. The Secession also enlisted German artists Käthe Kollwitz, Otto Nagel and Heinrich Zille, and championed French impressionism, pointillism and symbolism. Baluschek regularly debuted his work in Secession exhibitions, becoming a foil for conservative critics. For example, Waldemar Count von Oriola, a Reichstag deputy from the National Liberal Party, termed his work a "rampant travesty of aesthetic norms.

In 1900 Baluschek fell in love with stage actress Charlotte von Pazatka-Lipinsky. He painted an artistic declaration of love for her in the form of a fairytale picture, in which he appeared as an elf giving a rose to a lady resembling Pzatka-Lipinsky. They were married in 1902 and moved into a house in the Tiergarten district of Berlin. However, their initially romantic marriage proved childless and personally unsatisfying, and they were divorced in 1913.

Baluschek was profiled in 1904 as the first in a monograph series by Hermann Esswein titled Modern Illustrators, which later included Edvard Munch, Toulouse-Lautrec and Aubrey Beardsley. Esswein highlighted not only Baluschek's popular fairytale illustrations, but also his gritty renderings of Berlin working-class life.

In 1908 Baluschek became a member of the board of directors of the Berlin Secession, in which capacity he became involved in increasingly contentious debate. The advent of Expressionism led to arguments among Secession members. For example, Max Beckmann complained of "one brazen impudence after another" by the new breed of painters, and Liebermann obstructed a Secession exhibit featuring Henri Matisse. In 1910, a more avant-garde splinter group, the New Secession, led by Georg Tappert and Max Pechstein, staged an "exhibition of works rejected by the Berlin Secession." Internal controversy peaked in 1913, precipitating the resignation of 42 artists from the Secession, including the entire board of directors, among them Baluschek. That same year Baluschek, then 43, married Irene Drösse, a 25-year-old former art student. Their marriage endured and during World War I Irene gave birth to two daughters.

=== Development during World War I (1914–1918) ===
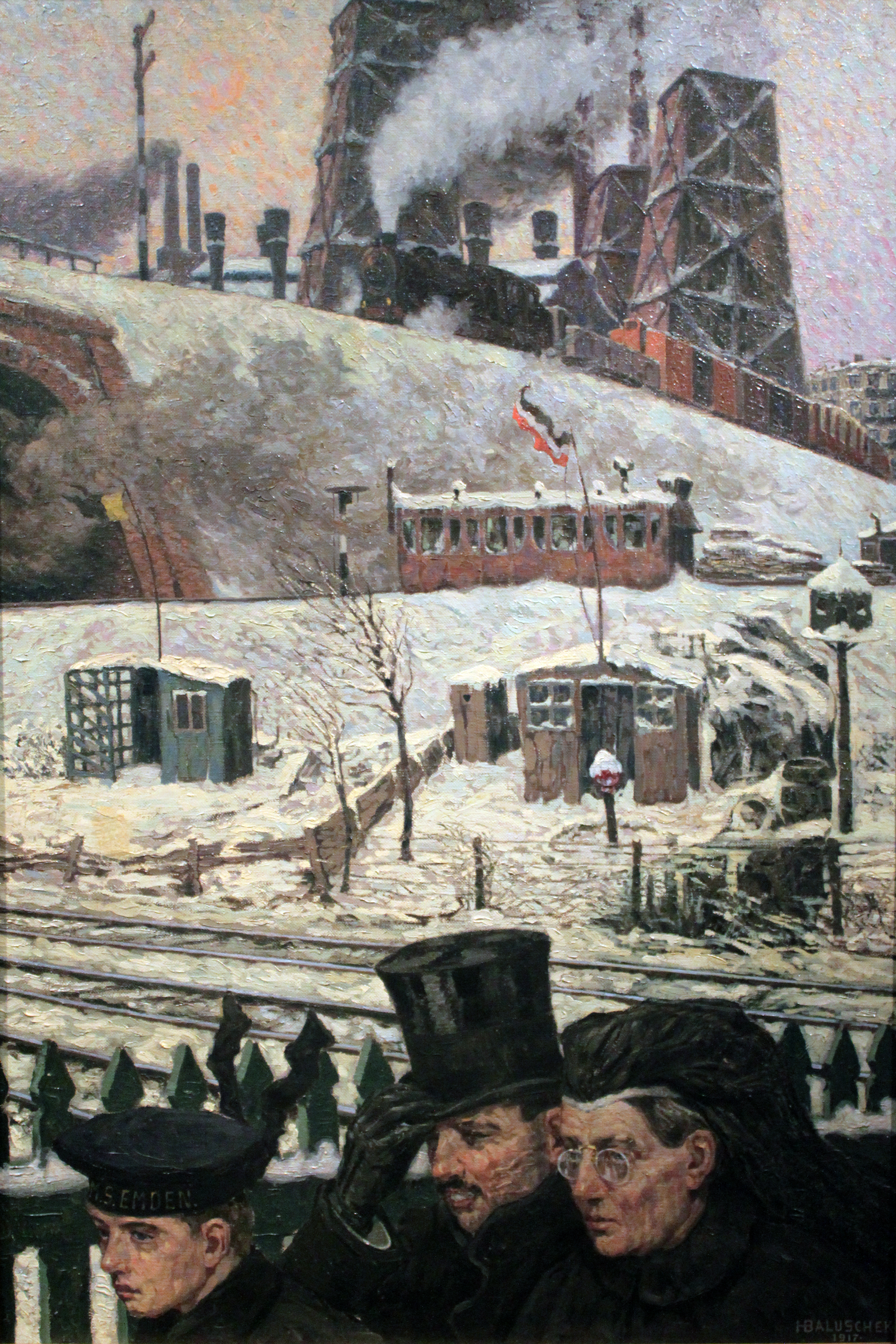
War Winter, 1917

The First World War had a profound influence on the arts scene in Berlin and on individual artists. Germany's declaration of war on Russia and France led to a release of pent-up tensions that had been building for decades due to strained international relations and repeated crises.

Even in the artistic community, there were optimistic patriotic expressions, although a few German artists, such as Kollwitz and Nagel, did not participate in the wave of popular enthusiasm. Baluschek and Liebermann were among those who contributed to art critic Paul Cassierer's journal Wartime (Kriegszeit), an attempt to show support for the war effort by the artistic community, and to the weekly publication Artists Journal of the War (Künstlerblätter zum Krieg). Several former Secession members, including Beckmann and Erich Heckel, volunteered for the German Army.

Baluschek's patriotic stance was at odds with his longstanding aversion to the Hohenzollern monarchy, but perhaps reflected an underlying resentment of the pervasive influence of French art in Germany. In 1915, he contributed nearly two dozen drawings to a war map published under the auspices of a hospital association. It included illustrations of modern weapons accompanied by a "glowing patriotic text," and grisly depictions of battle scenes and field hospitals.

Although in his 40s, Baluschek volunteered for military service, and in 1916 was posted as a reservist first to the Western Front, then to the Eastern Front. During his time in the Army, he drafted more solemn depictions of battle scenes. (His close friend Martin Brandenburg, a fellow Secessionist, was severely wounded in the fighting, losing an eye, and was to die from his wounds after the war in 1919.) Baluschek's 1917 painting To the Homeland (Zur Heimat) depicts a soldier's coffin bearing medals being loaded for transport to Germany, and evokes the soldier's patriotic sacrifice. The end of the war in 1918, with its catastrophic outcome for Germany, shook Baluscheck deeply, and he kept his distance from the revolution that spawned the Weimar Republic. His artistic output shrank to a few illustrations and a Self-portrait showing him with a somber expression.

World War I

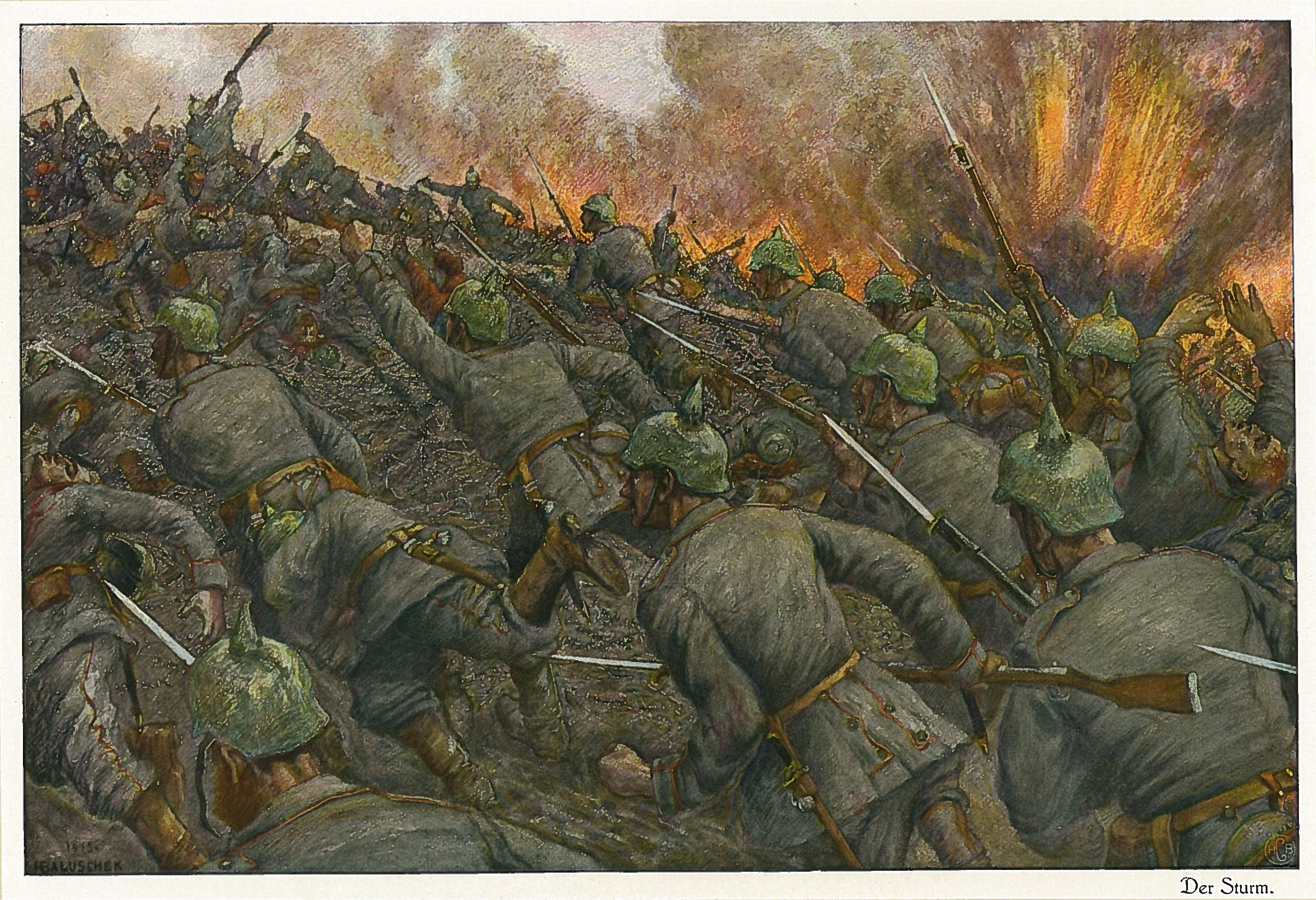
Attack – (Depicting German troops)

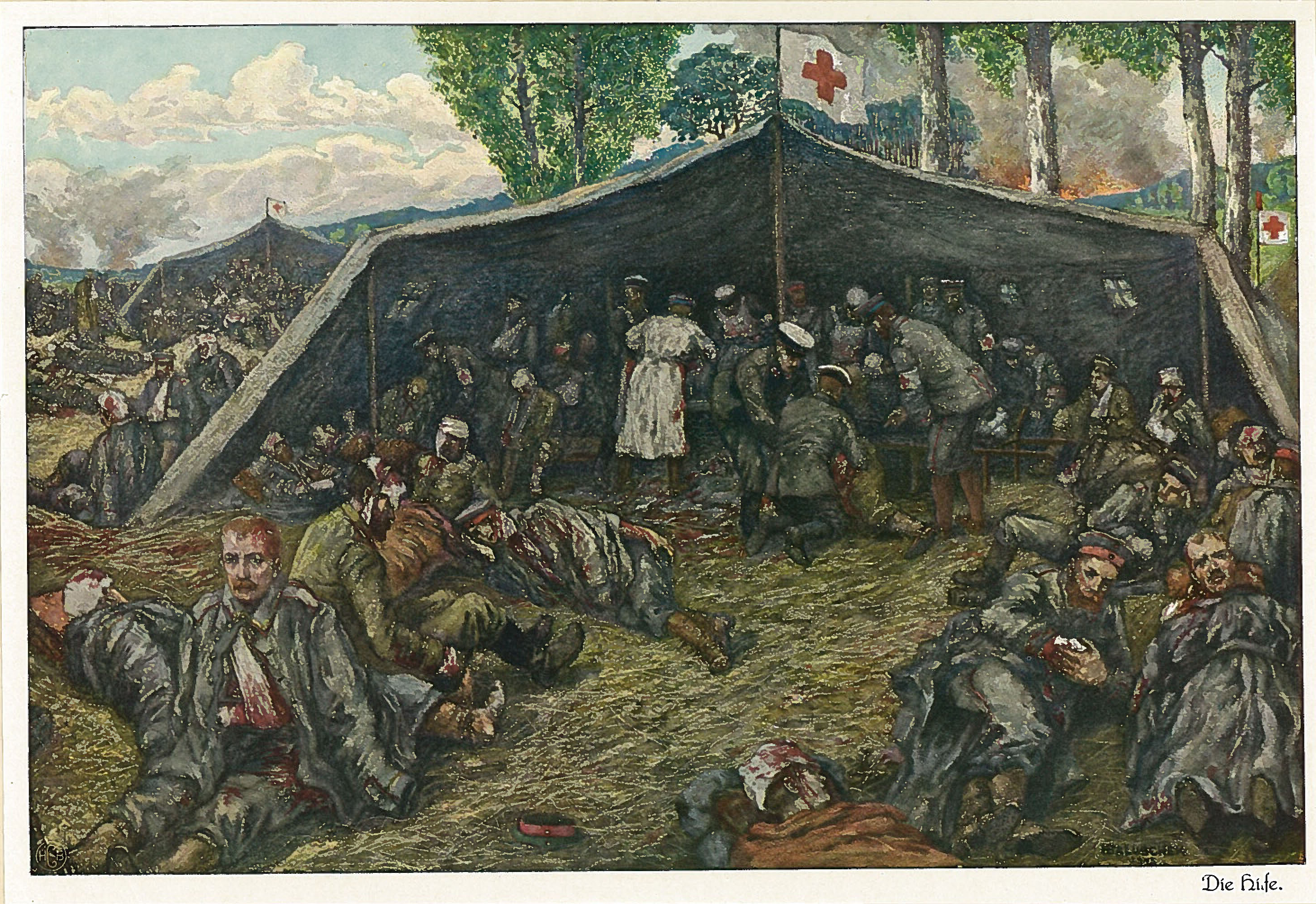
Field Hospital

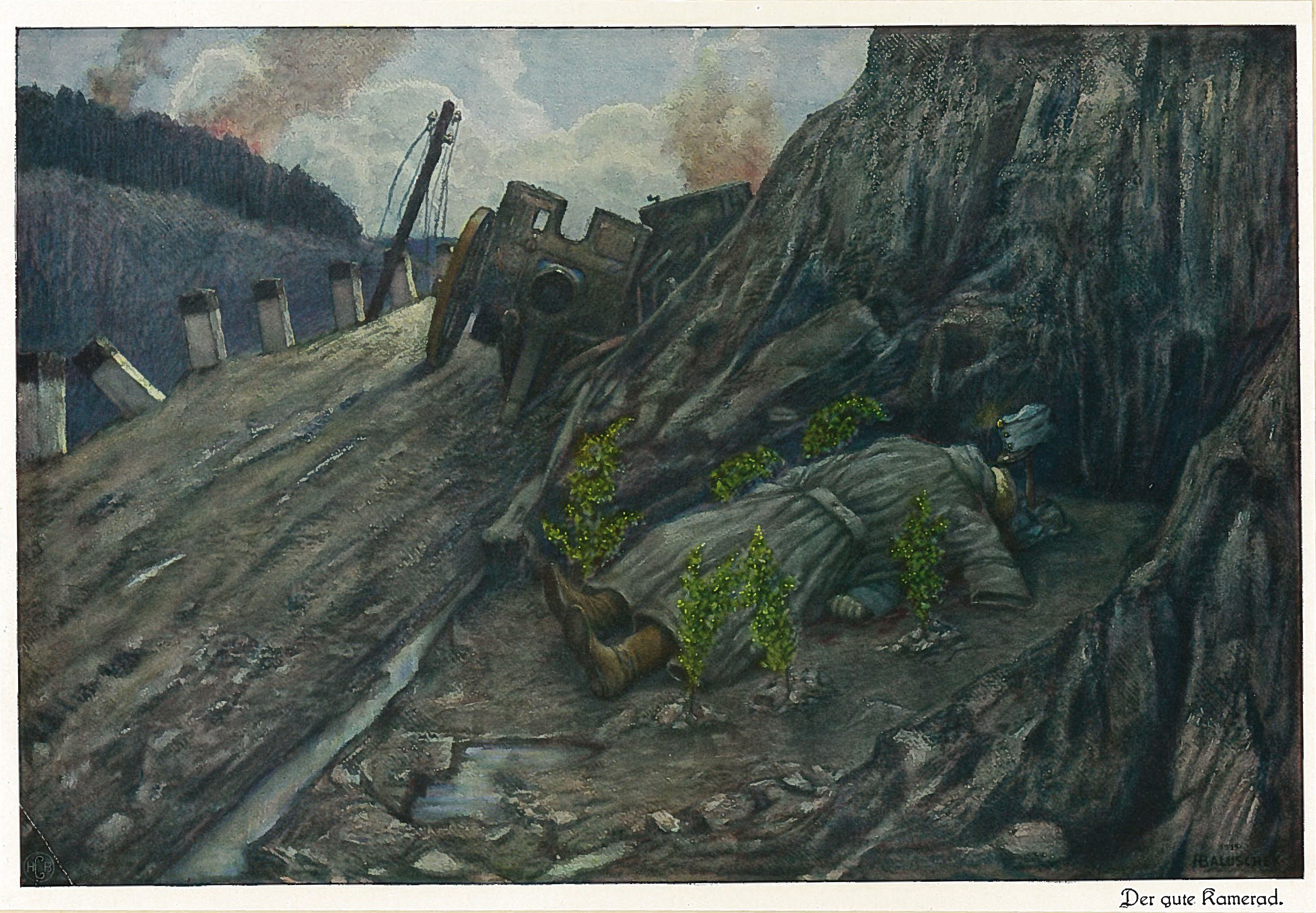
War

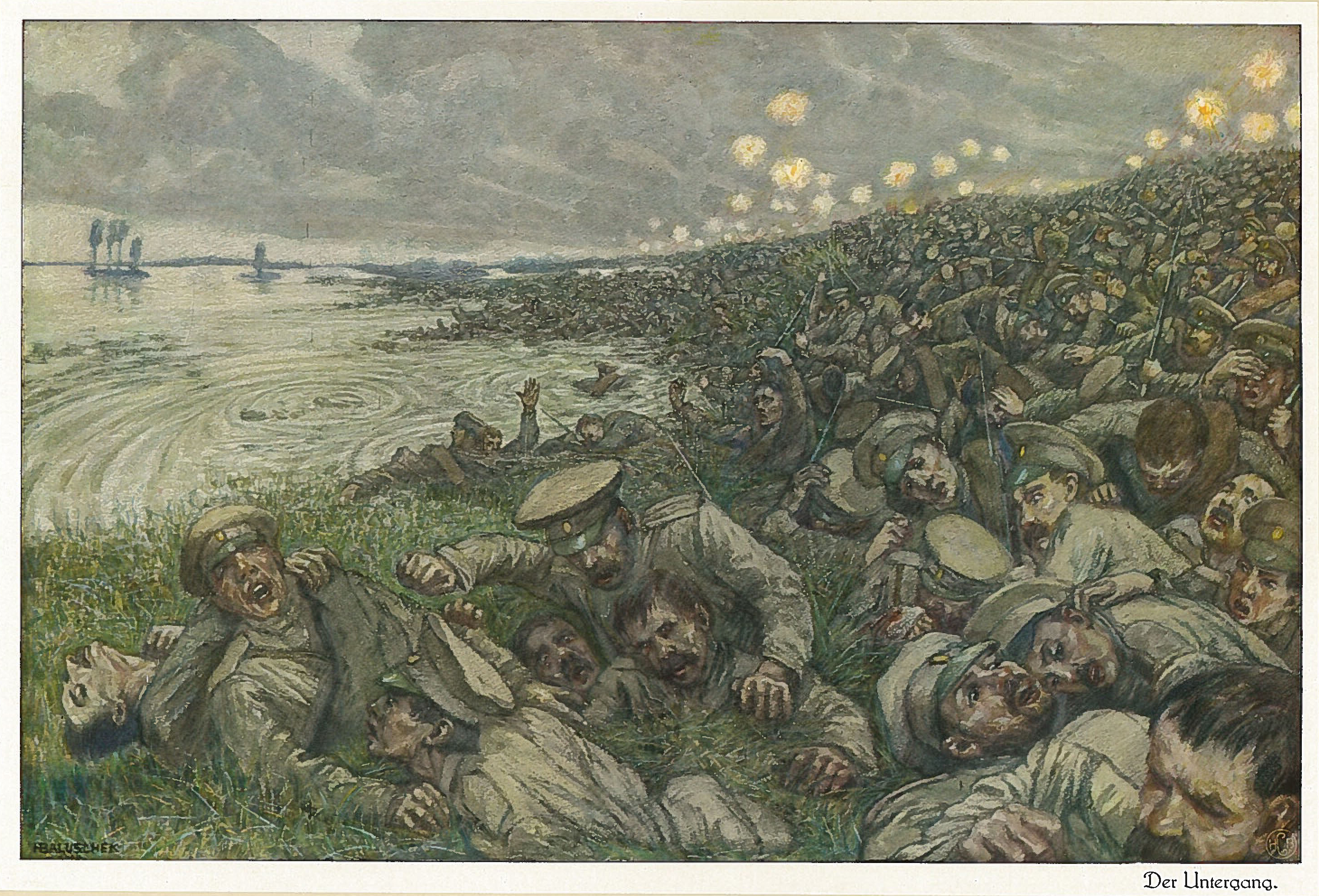
Defeat – (Depicting Russian troops)

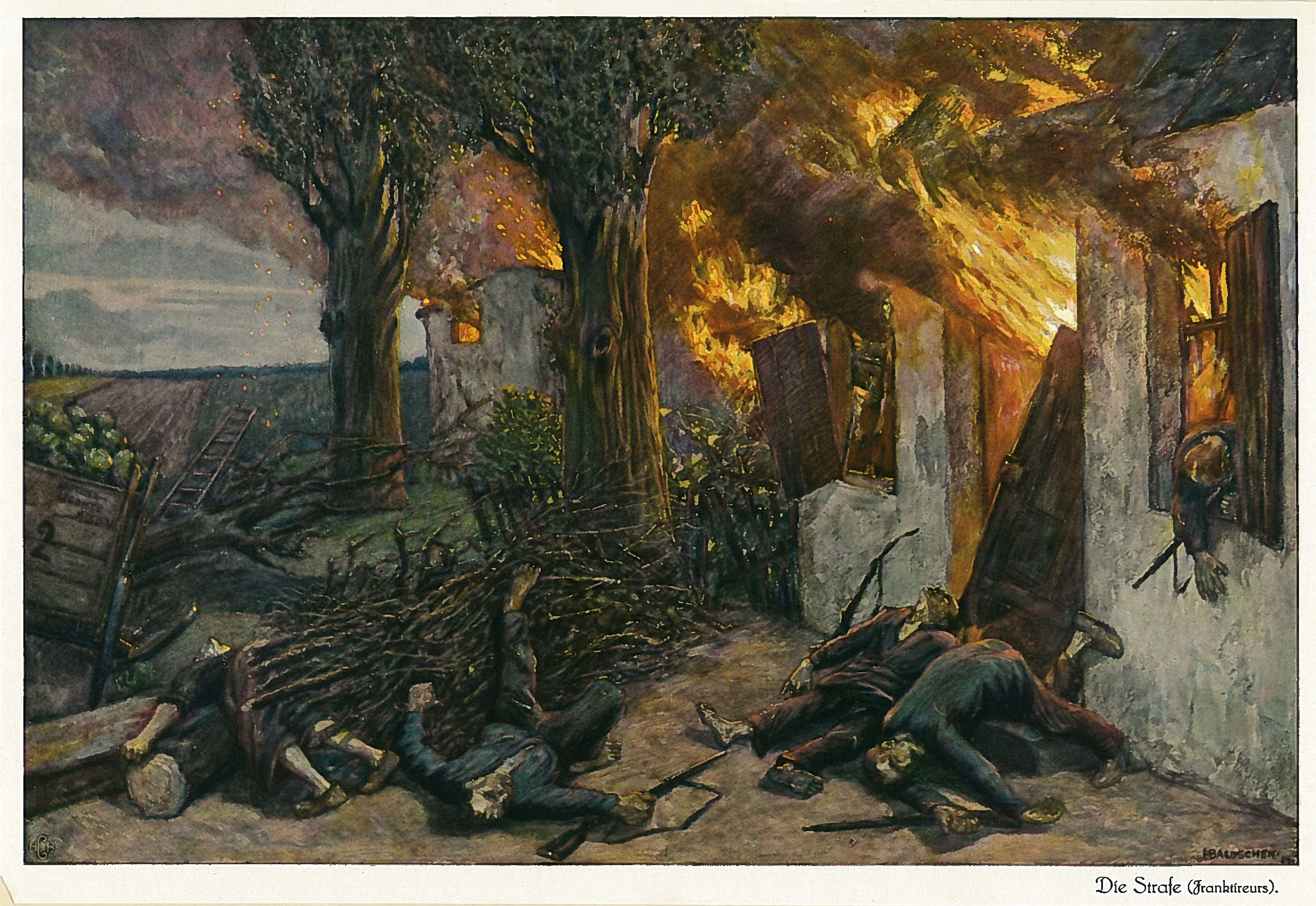
Punishment – (Depicting killed Francs-tireurs)

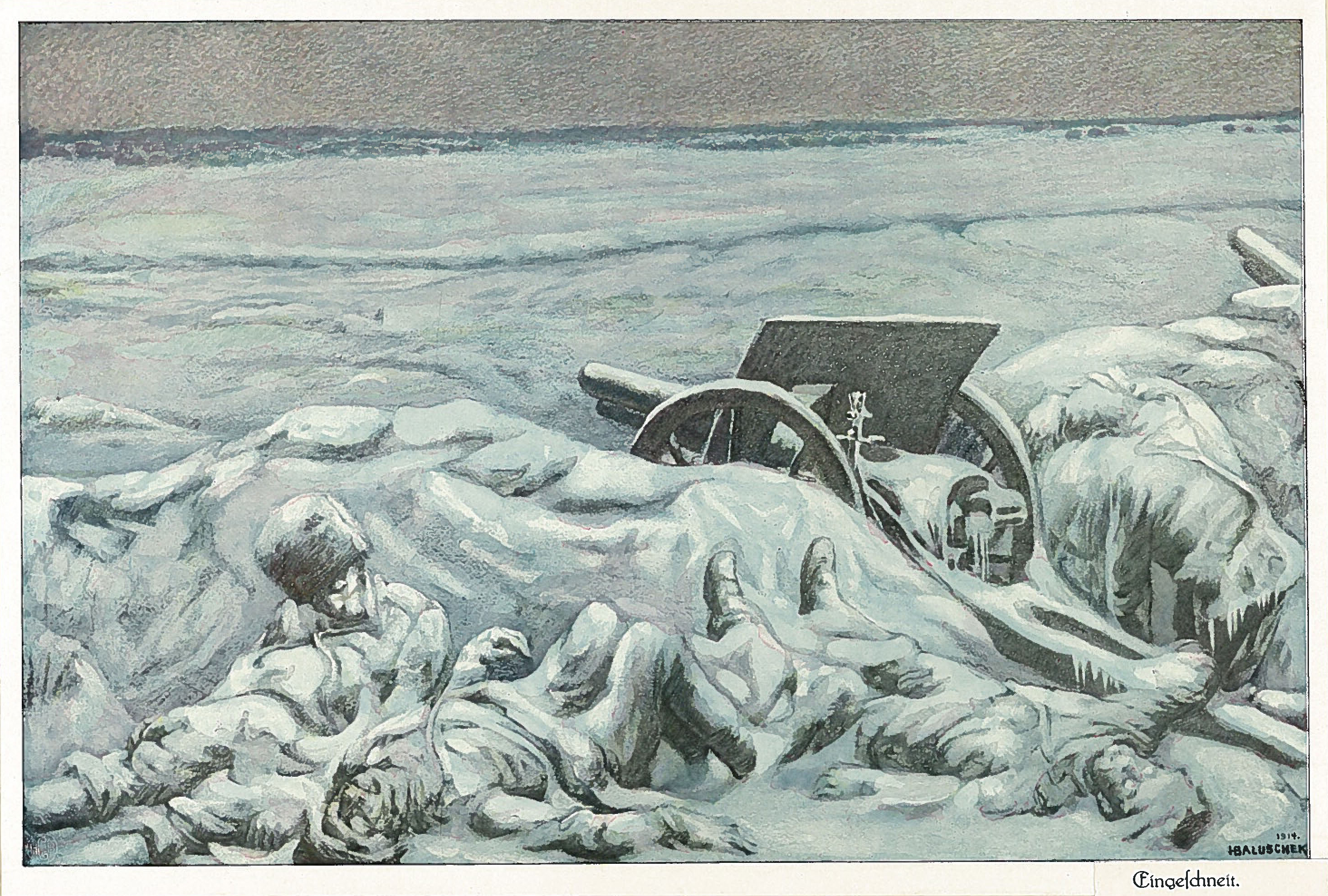
Snowed In

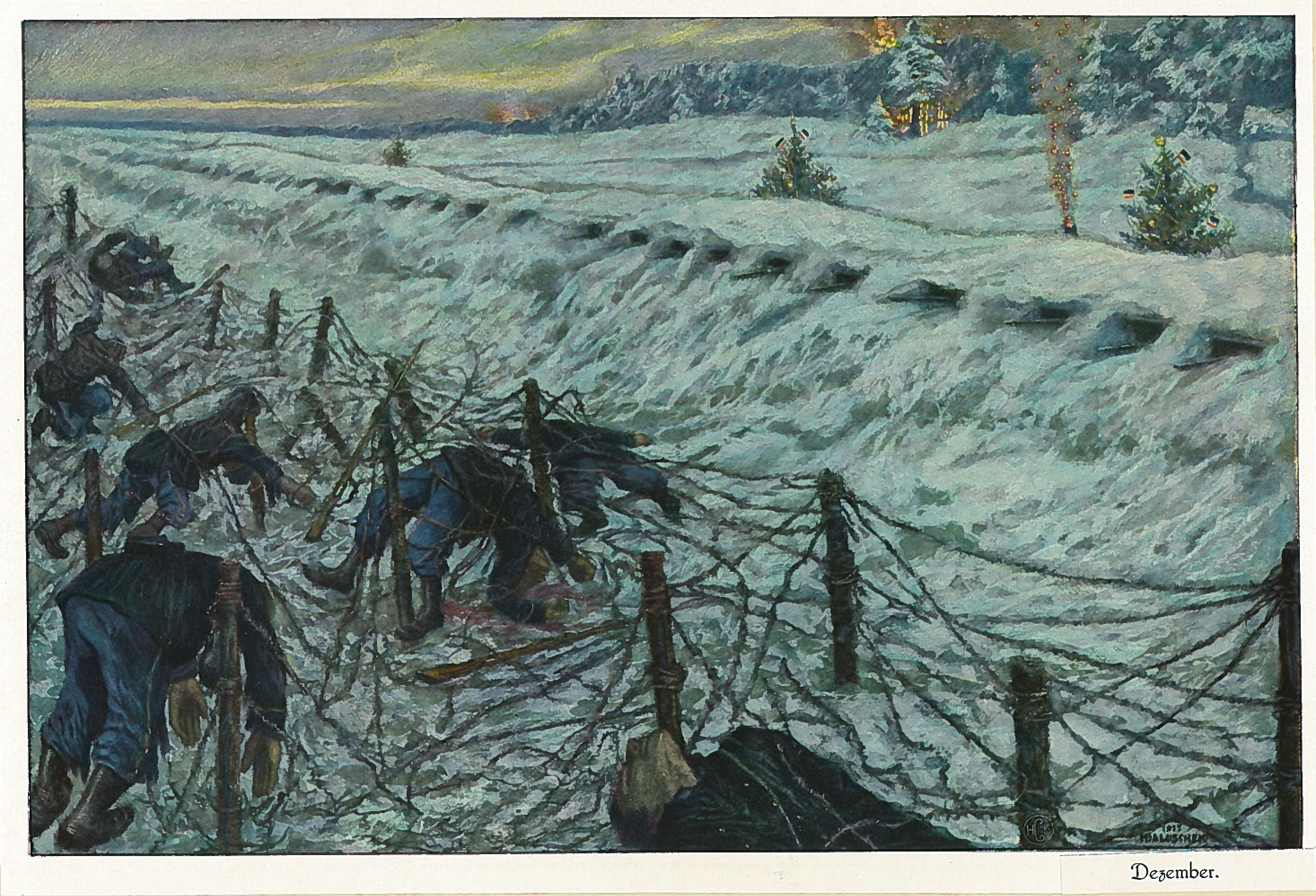
December

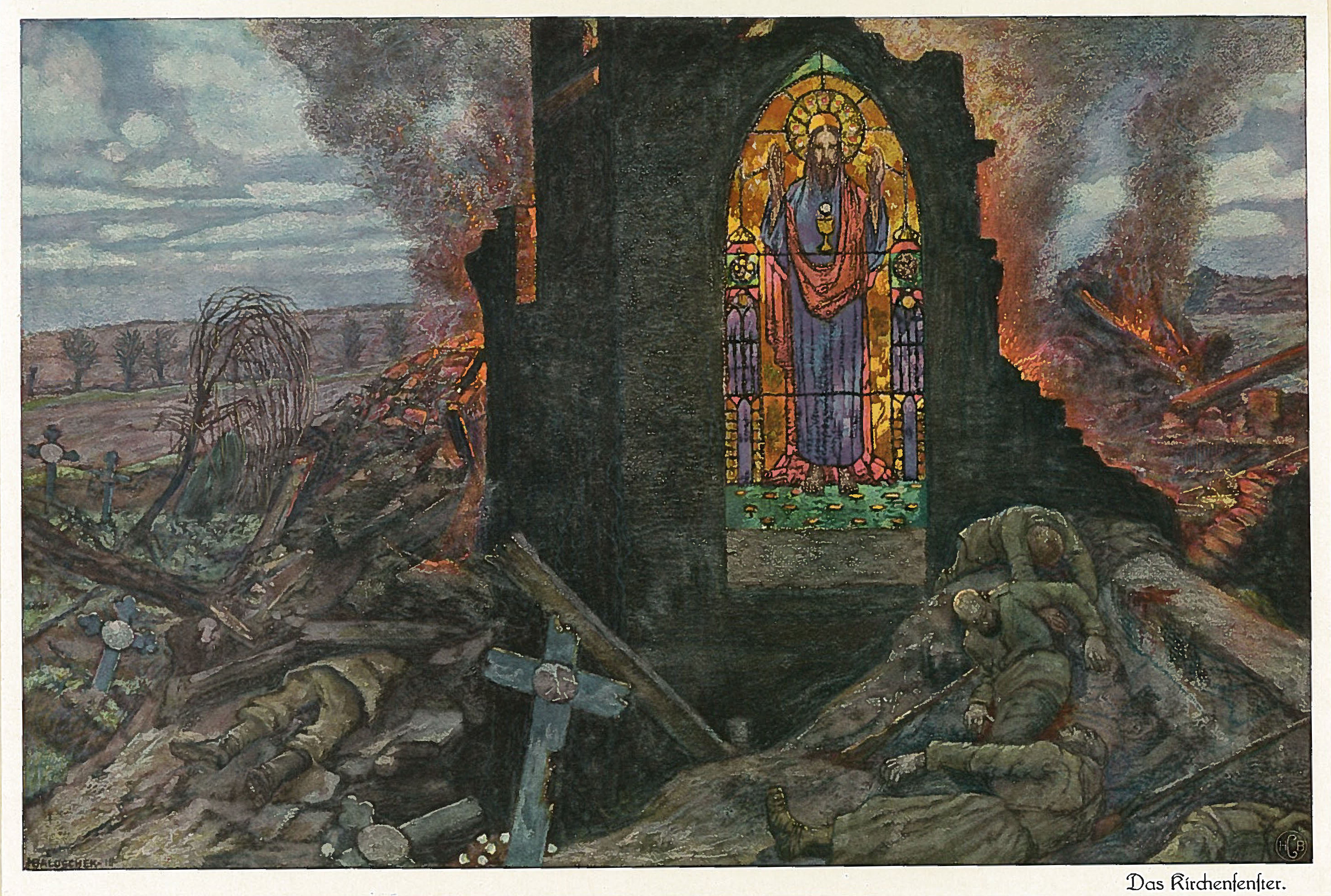
The Church Window

=== The Weimar years (1918–1935) ===
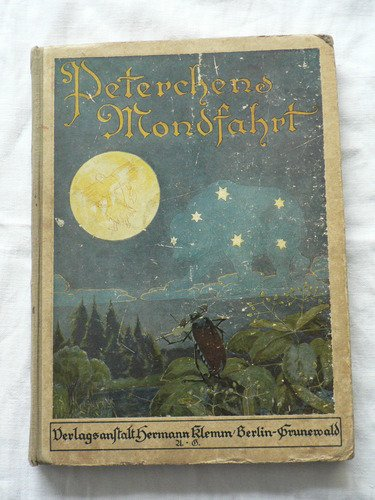
Baluschek's cover illustration, 1919

For Baluschek the artist, the following years were dominated by illustrations of fairytales, and those he contributed to Little Peter's Journey to the Moon (Peterchens Mondfahrt) in 1919 are still considered classics of children's literature. Baluschek illustrated other children's books, among them What the Calendar Tells Us (Was der Kalender erzählt), Into Fairytale-land (In's Märchenland) and About Little People, Little Animals, and Little Things (Von Menschlein, Tierlein, Dinglein), appearing in 1919, 1922 and 1924 respectively. He also illustrated a 1925 edition of Grimm's Fairytales. Meanwhile, he produced posters and promotional materials for the theater and cinema, along with drawings of costumes for producers, and imaginative scenes of Berlin life for the famed Lutter & Wegner wine bar.

Like many other artists, Baluschek found himself in crisis after the war, but he seized opportunities, and decided to become active in cultural education. He supported production of the film Mother Krause's Journey to Happiness (1919), which depicted the cruelty of poverty and lauded Communism as a saving force. In 1920, he was among founders of the People's School of Greater Berlin (Volkshochschule Gross-Berlin) and taught painting there.

Baluschek also was among founders of the League for Proletarian Literature (Bund für proletarische Literatur), and in 1924 was appointed to the literary advisory board of the Social Democratic Party's "book circle." He joined the party in 1920 and served as chairman of the artists representatives from the Schöneberg district. He became an advisor to Mayor Gustav Böss, and played a leading role in foundation of the Welfare Bureau for Berlin Artists, of which he was for a time chairman.

Journey to the Moon, 1919

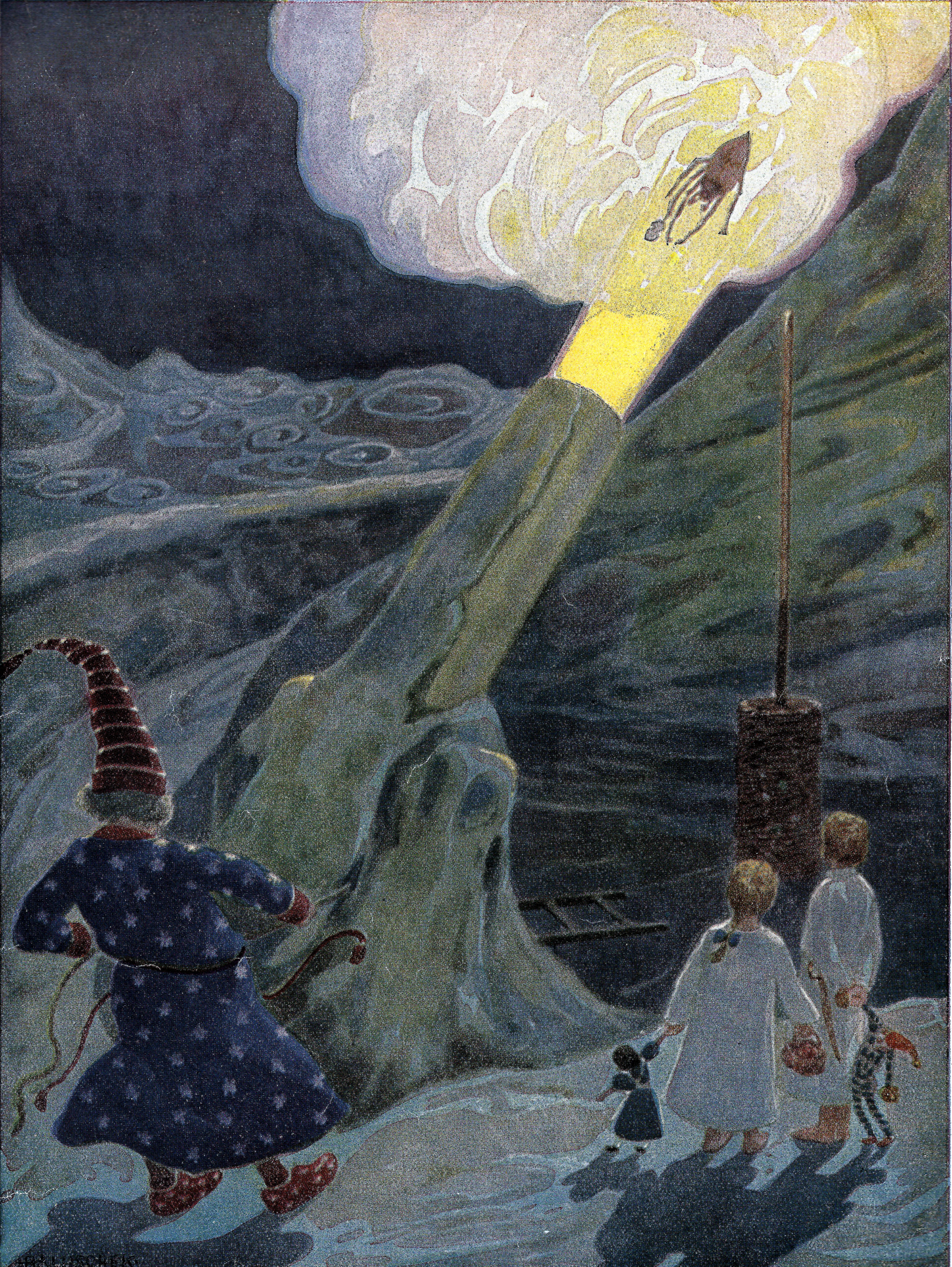
The Moon Cannon

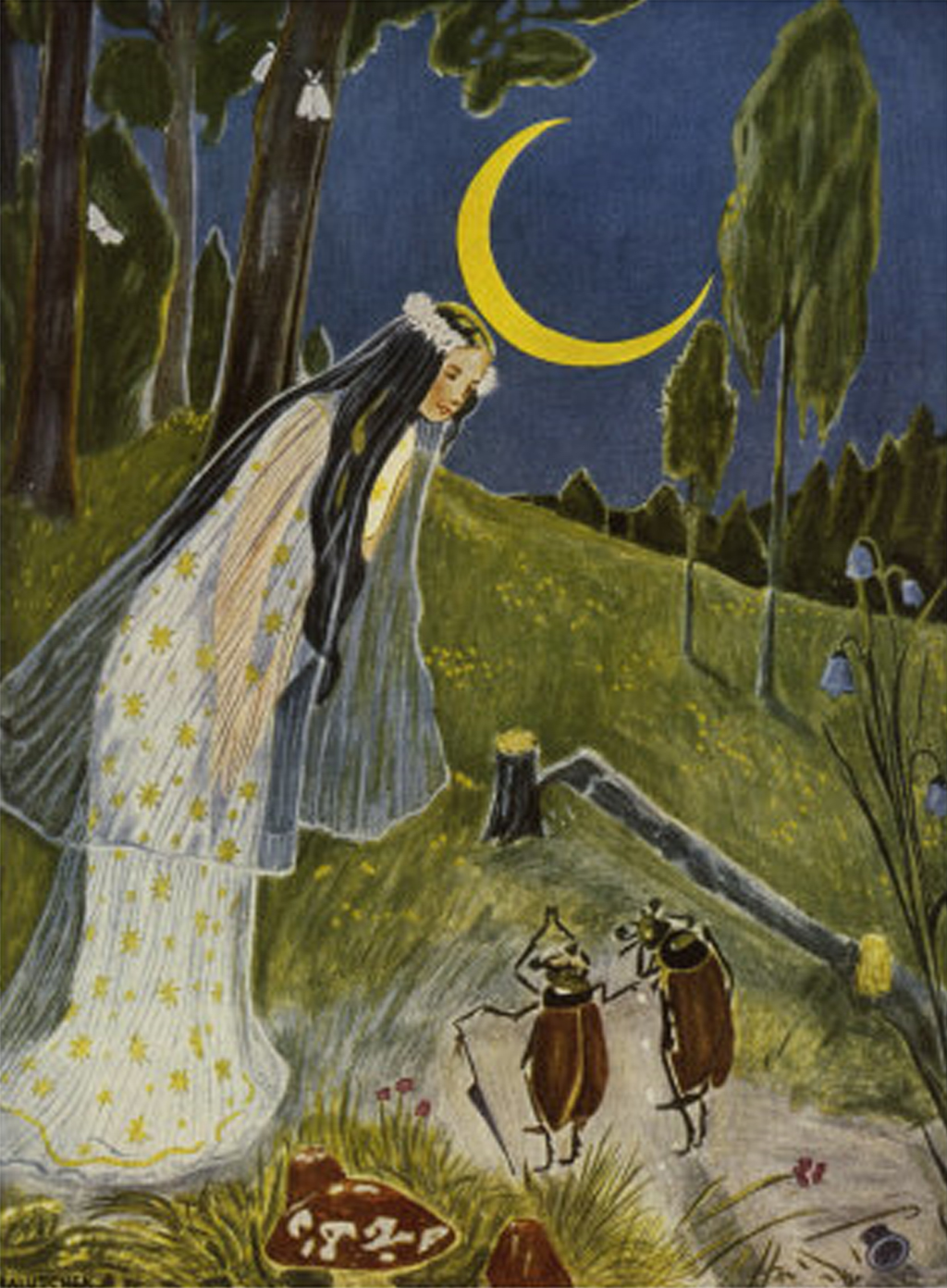
Night

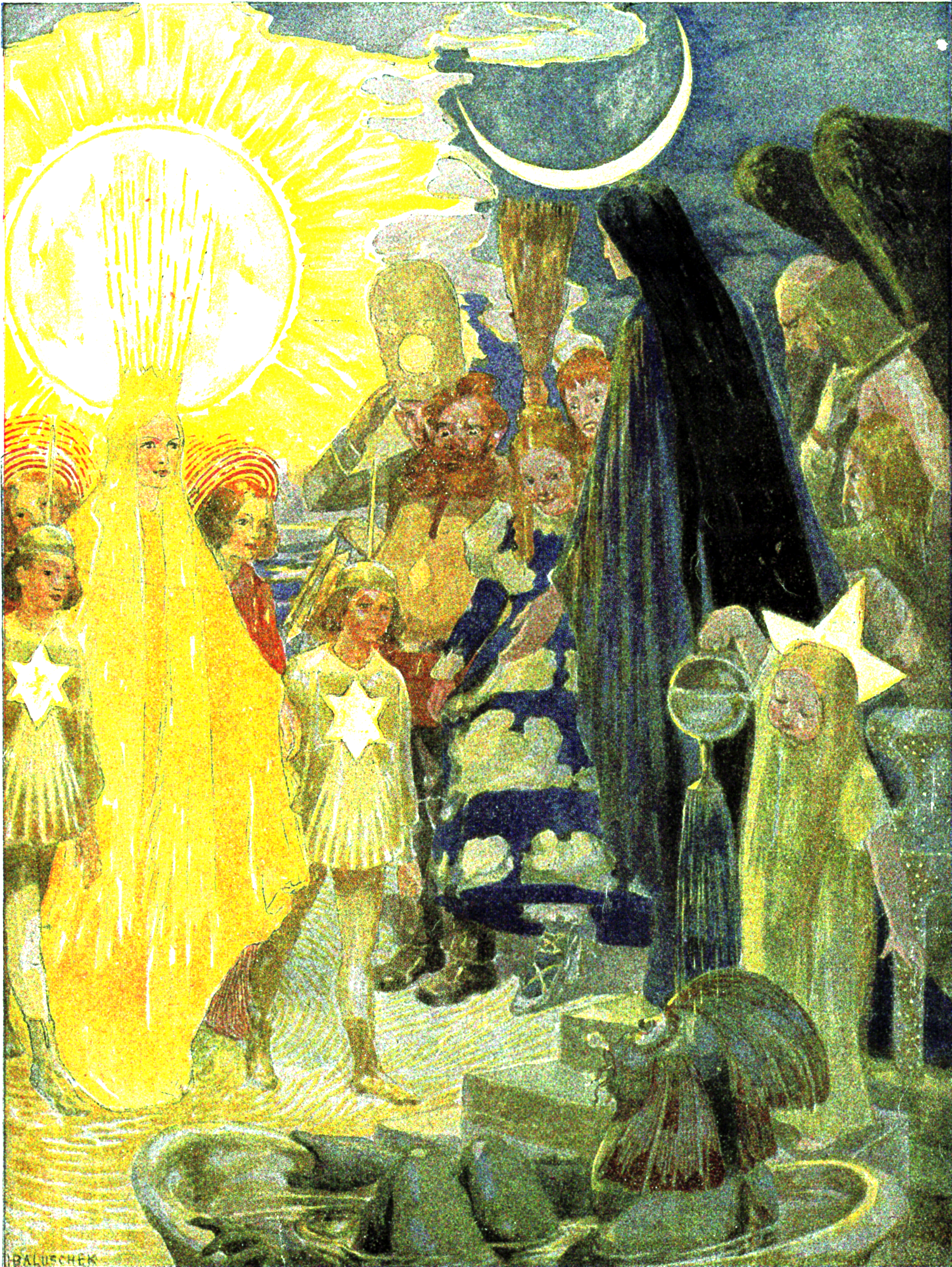
Palace of the Night Fairy

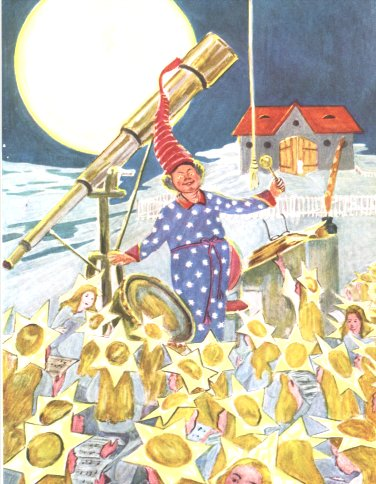
Starry Meadow

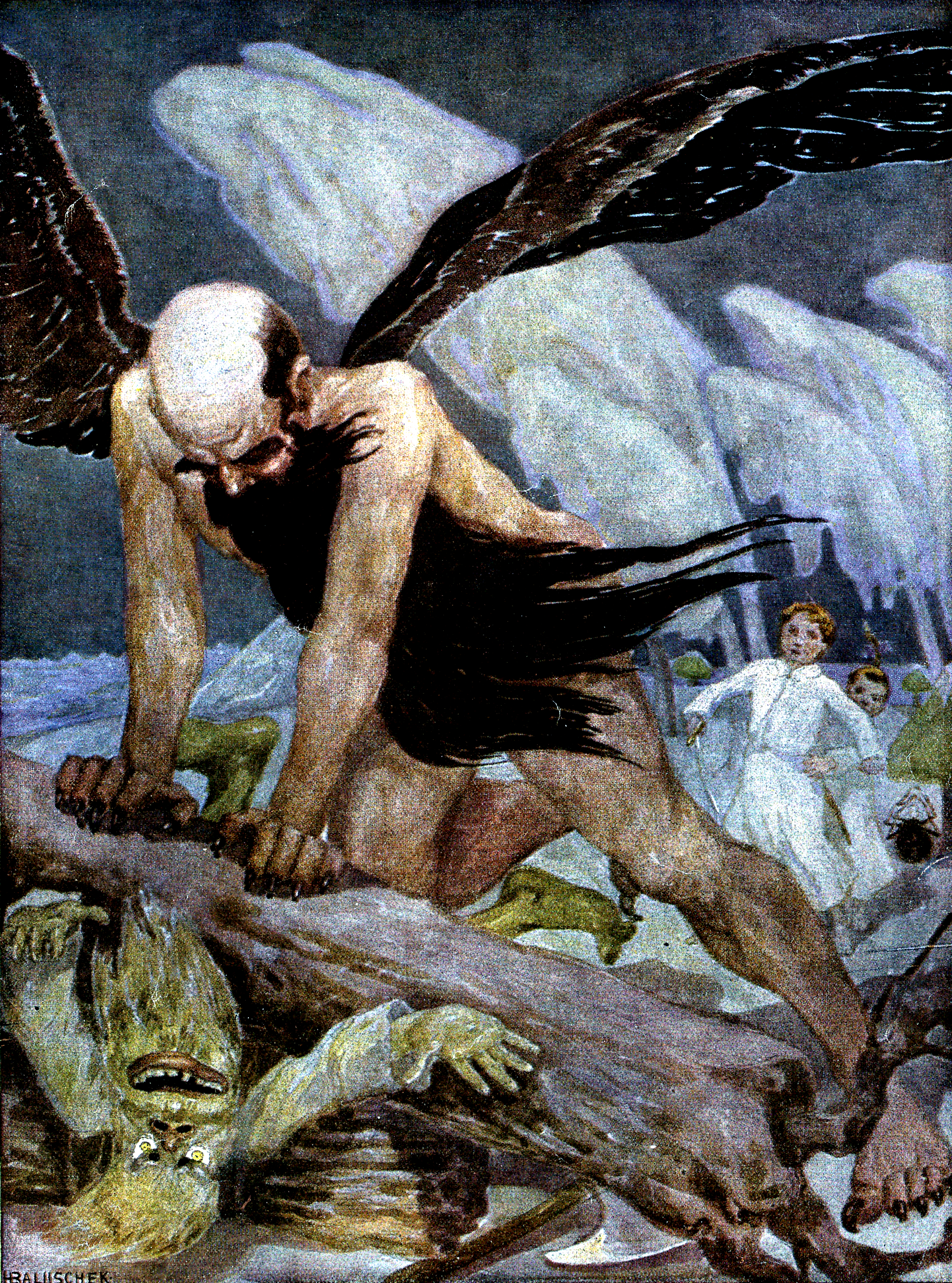
The Battle with the Man-in-the-Moon

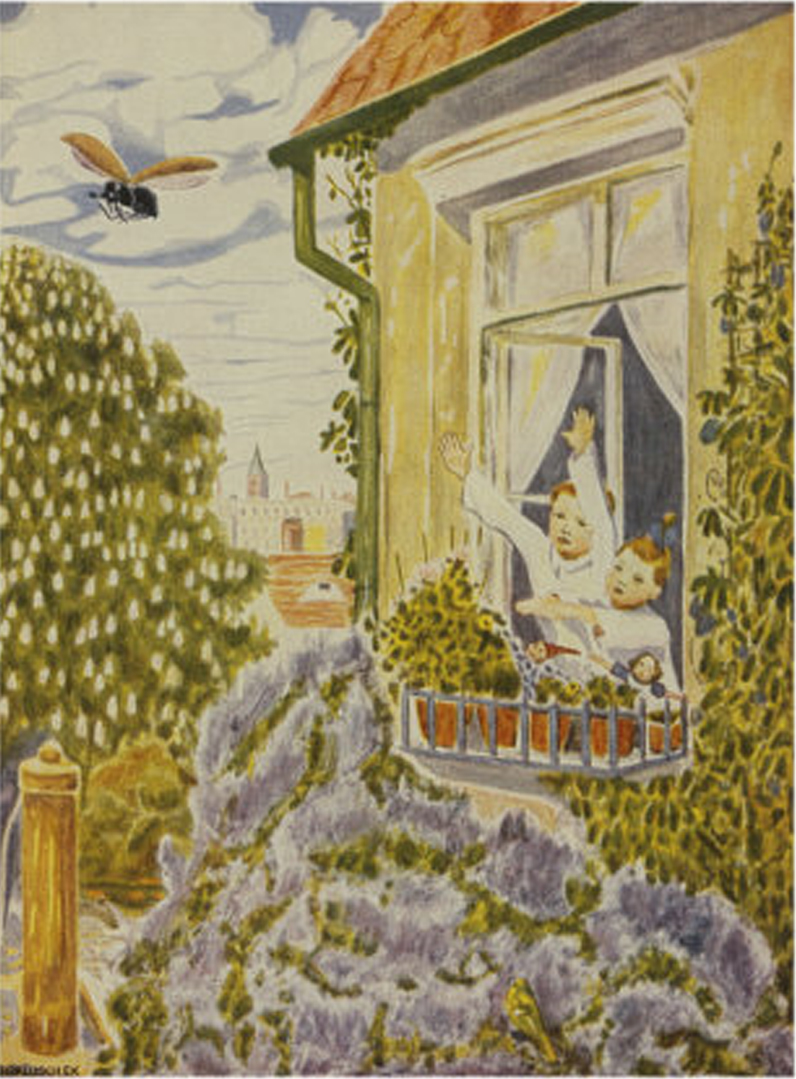
Back Home

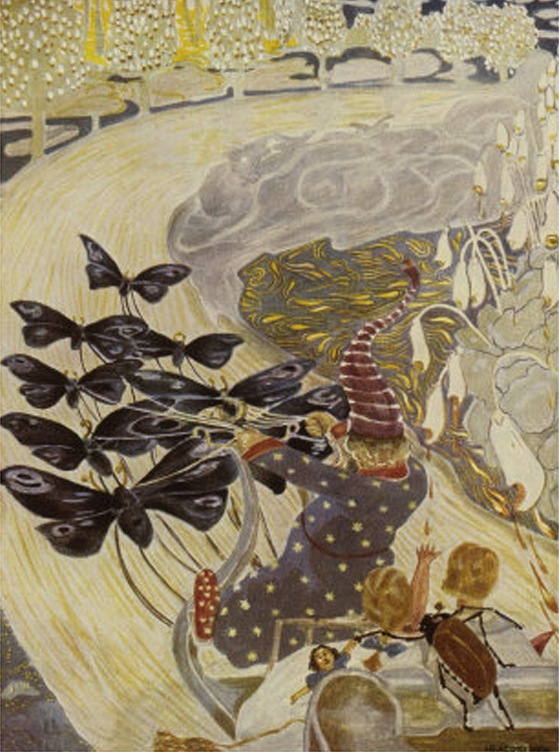
An illustration from Journey to the Moon

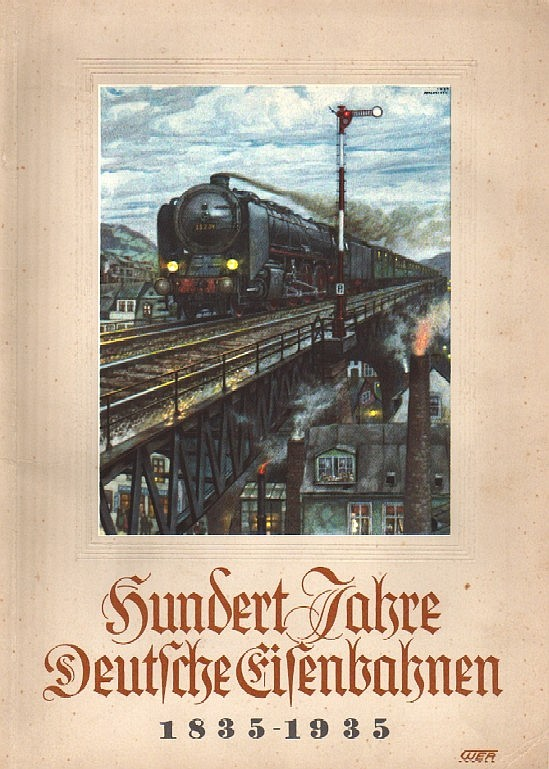
Baluschek's cover illustration for One Hundred years of German Railroads

Baluschek illustrated a number of periodicals, including the Social Democratic Illustrated National Banner (Illustrierte Reichsbannerzeitung), and also school books and novels; his fascination with rail transport shows in illustrations from this period. He belonged to the left wing of the Social Democrats, and was comfortable with activities of the Communists, a sizeable political force in Weimar Germany. His painting Future (Zukunft) appeared as the title page of the Communist journal Hammer and Sickle in 1920. Baluschek was among 10 German left-leaning artists who contributed to a 1924 international antiwar conference in Amsterdam. In 1929–31 he was director of the Greater Berlin Art Exhibition.

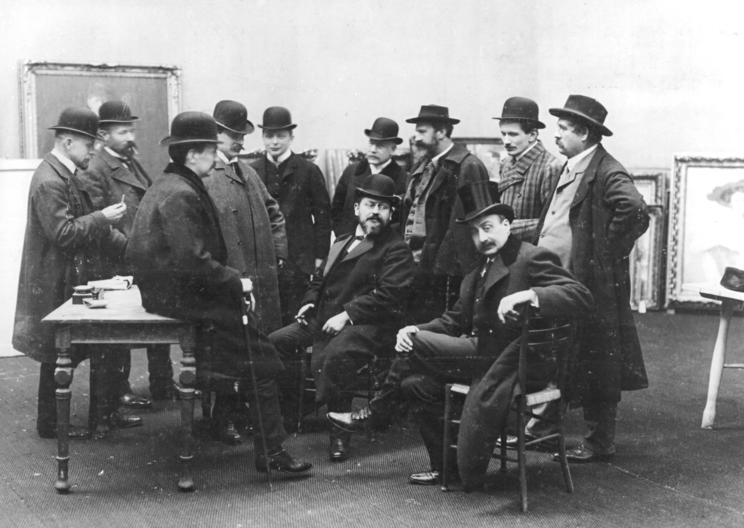
Judges of the Berlin Secession (1908), left to right: Fritz Klimsch, August Gaul, Walter Leistikow, Hans Baluschek, Paul Cassirer, Max Slevogt (seated), George Mosson (standing), Max Kruse (standing), Max Liebermann (seated), Emil Rudolf Weiß (standing), Lovis Corinth (standing)

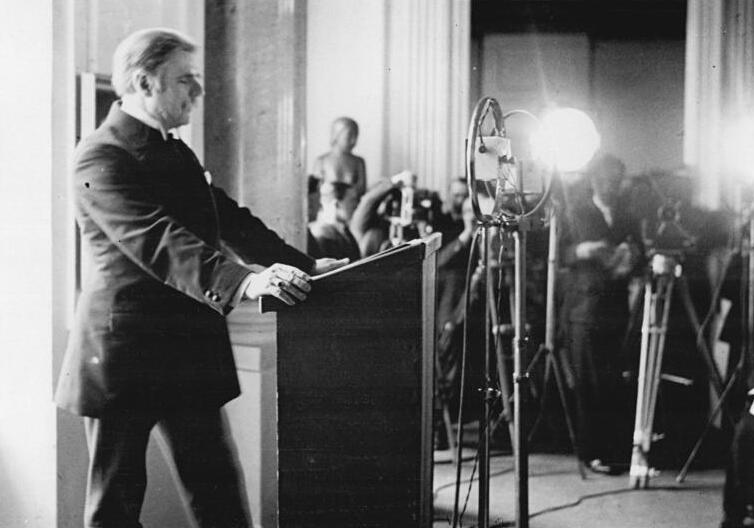
Baluschek opens the Greater Berlin Art Exhibition in 1931

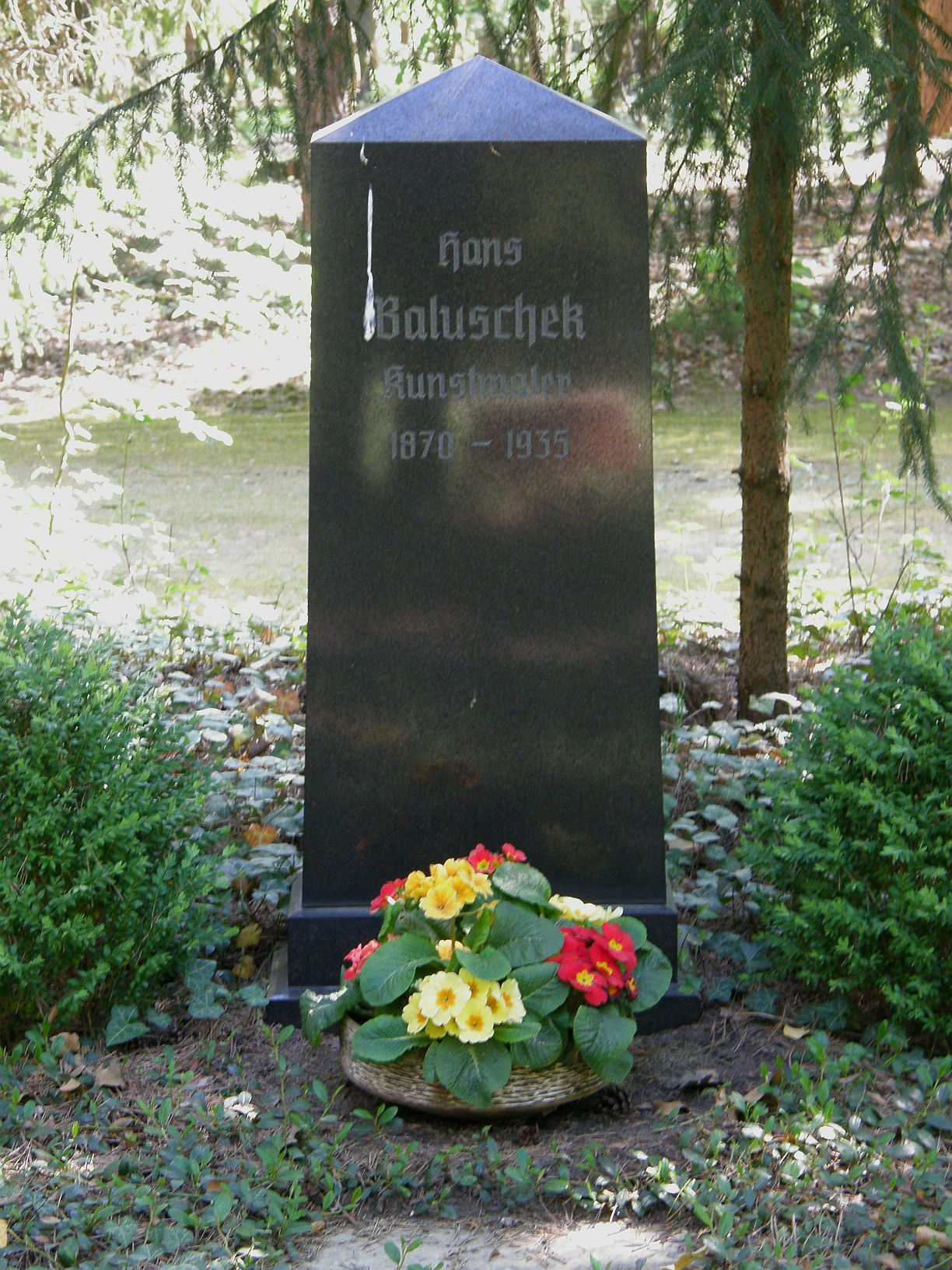
Baluschek's grave

== Proscribed by Nazis ==
Predictably, after the Nazis came to power in January 1933 they branded Baluschek a "Marxist artist" and classified his work as so-called degenerate art (entartete Kunst). He was dismissed from all his posts and banned from exhibiting.

His painting Eisenwalzwerk, commissioned by the industrialist Heinrich Eisner (1850–1918) in 1910, was the subject of a forced sale from the Eisner family in the late 1930s. Its story was told in a podcast broadcast in 2025.

Hans Baluschek died on 28 September 1935 in Berlin, aged 65, and was buried in the Wilmersdorf Forest Cemetery in Stahnsdorf, south of Berlin near Potsdam.

== Postwar events ==
Hans Baluschek is not among the most well-known artists of the Berlin Secession. In postwar West Germany he received comparatively little attention, while in East Germany he was lionized for his left-leaning themes, and his works frequently were reproduced as illustrations in various publications. Exhibits of his works were staged on anniversaries of his death, notably in the Märkisches Museum in East Berlin. In 1981, a memorial plaque was placed on a house he had occupied in the Schöneberg district of Berlin.

After reunification, in 2004 a small park in Schöneberg (Hans-Baluschek-Park) was named after him.

== Selected works ==
Selected works

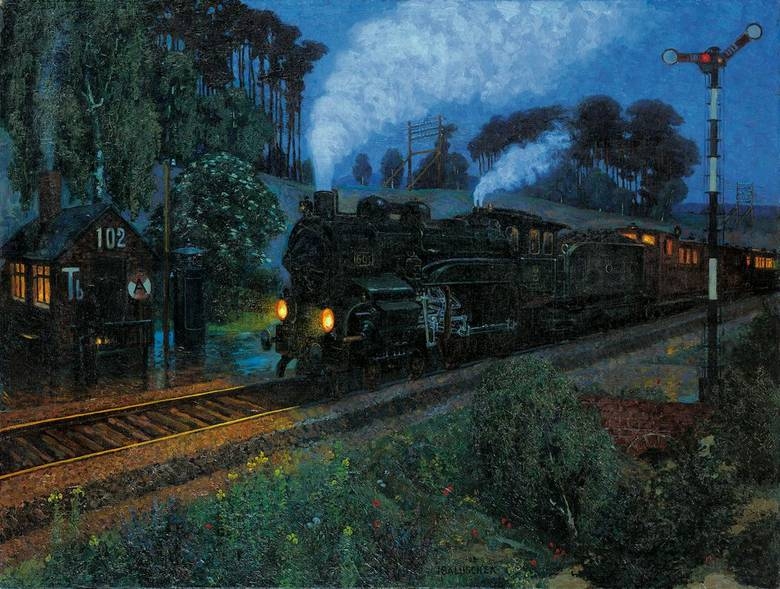
The Express Train Arrives, 1909

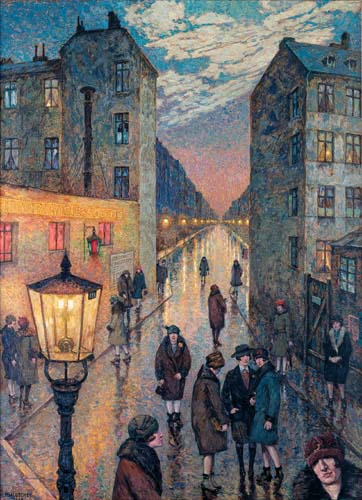
Corner of the Big City, 1929

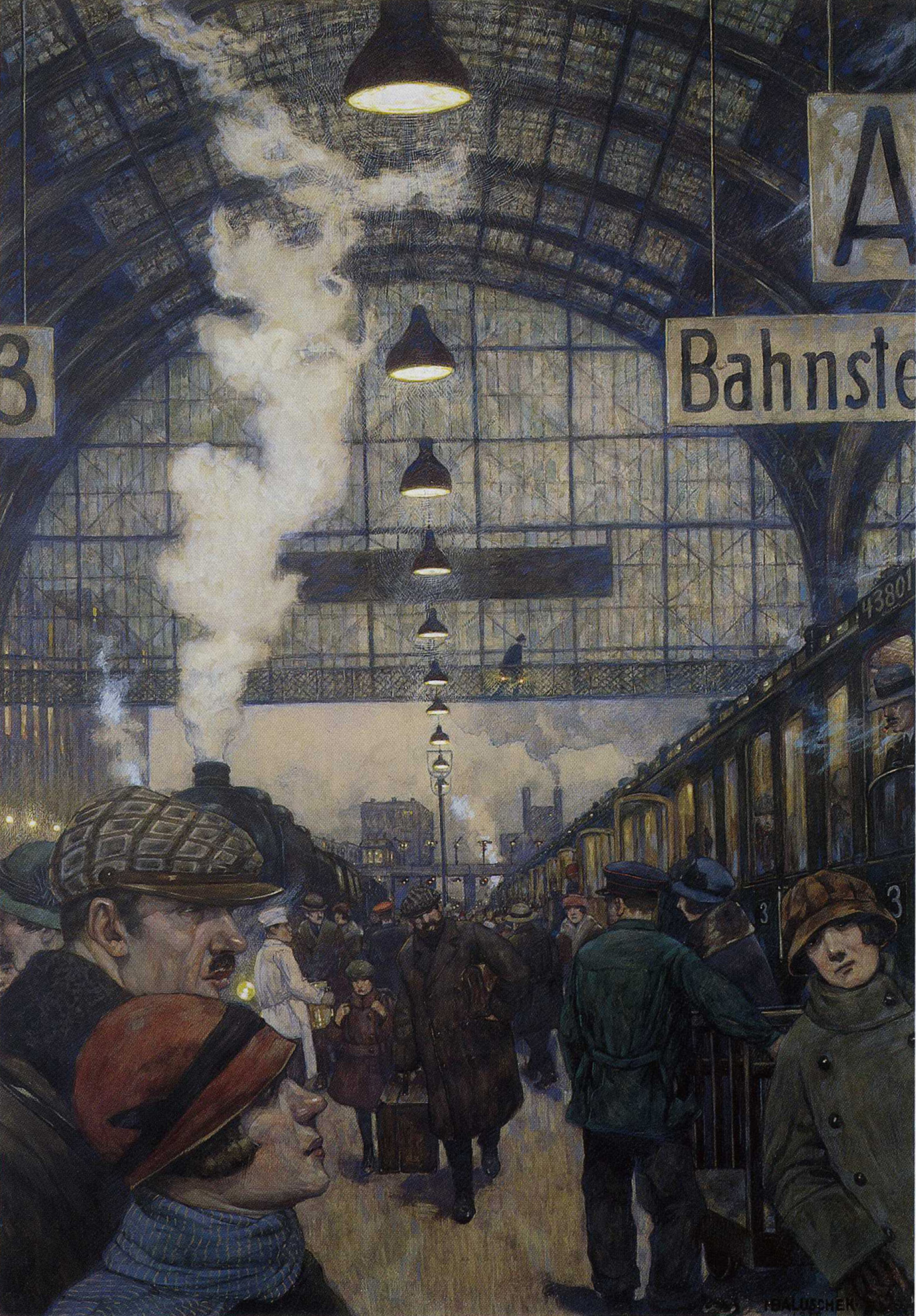
Railway Station, 1929

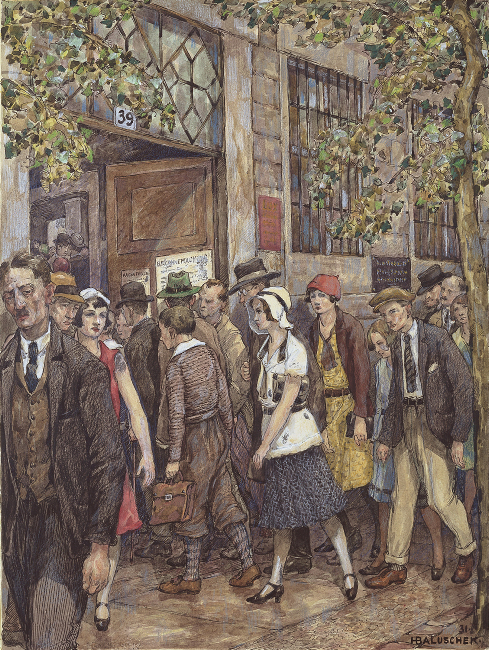
Employment Office, 1931

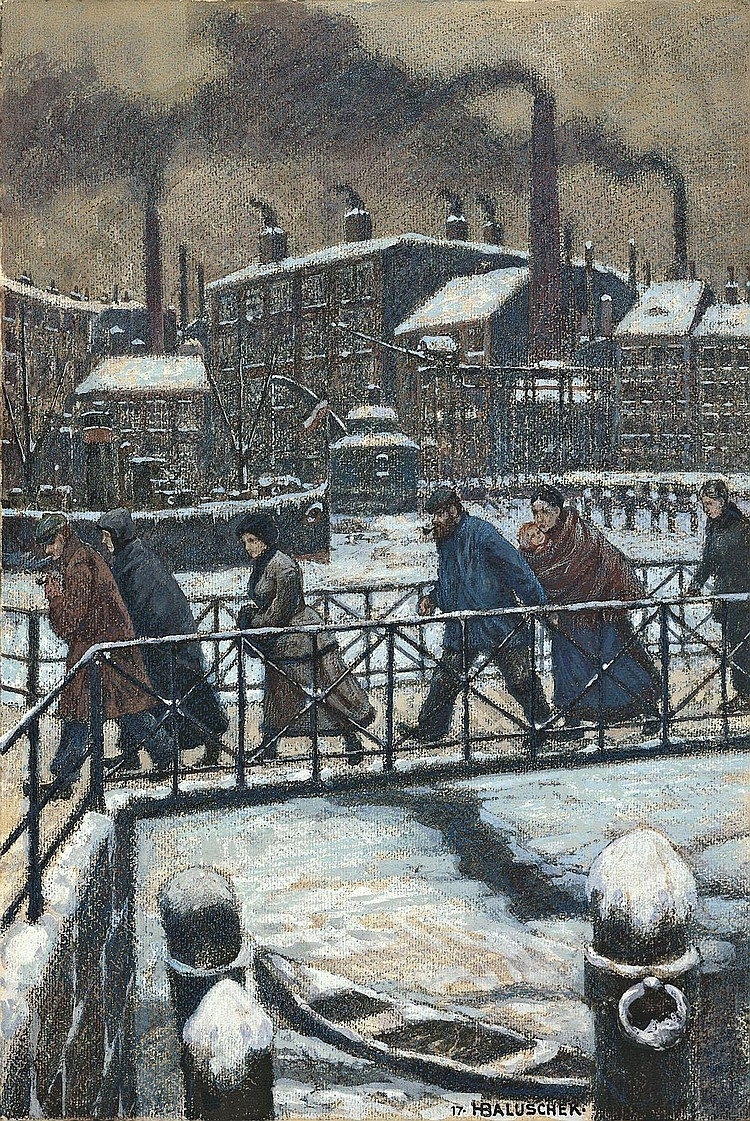
Cold, 1917

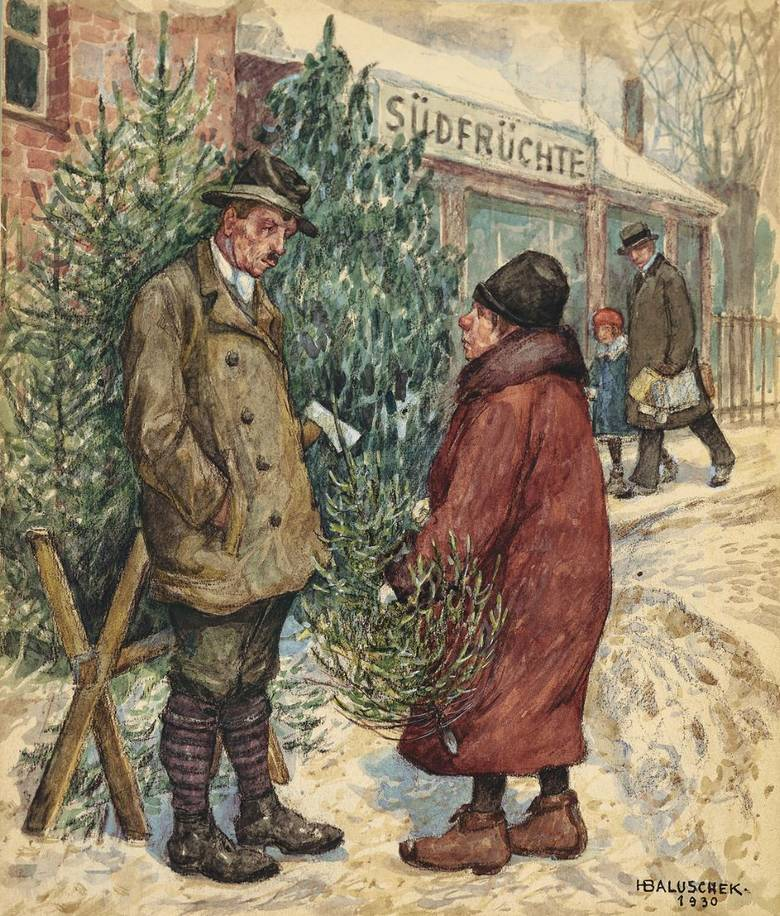
Christmas Tree Sale 1930

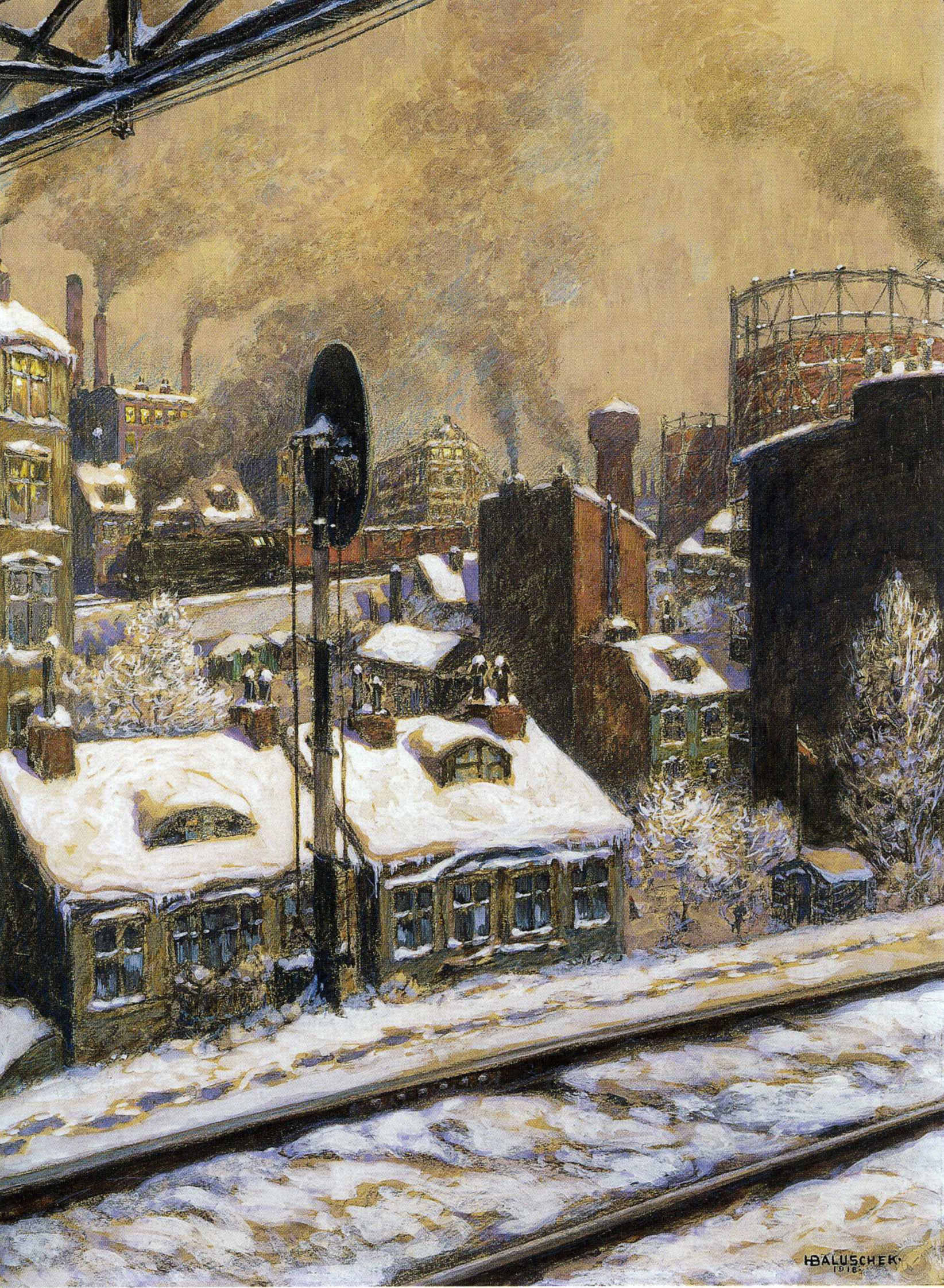
Deep Snow, 1918

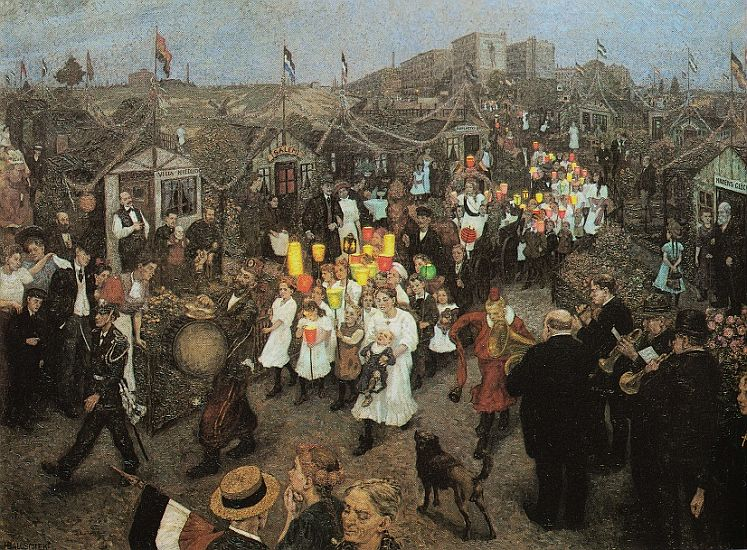
Summer Festival, 1909

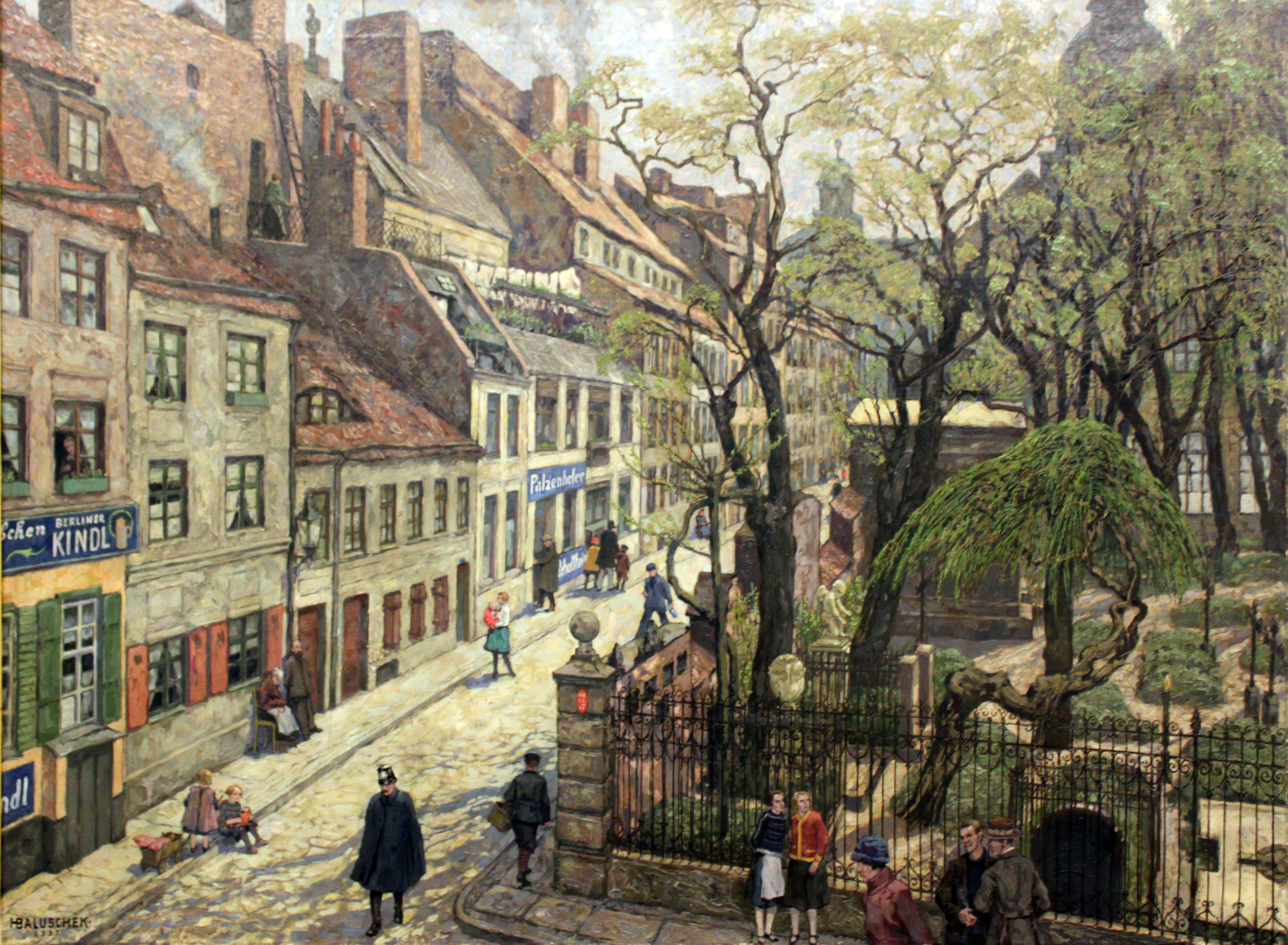
Orphan Street, Berlin, 1927

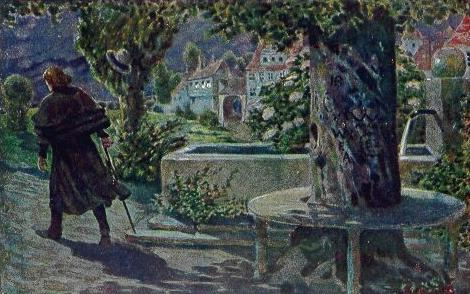
Fountain near the City Gate, 1935

== Sources ==
- Margit Bröhan: Hans Baluschek. 1870–1935. Maler, Zeichner, Illustrator. 2. erweiterte Auflage. Bröhan-Museum, Berlin 2002, ISBN 3-9807894-0-3 .
- Hermann Esswein: Hans Baluschek. Piper, München und Leipzig 1910.
- Hans Mackowski: Hans Baluschek. In: Kunst und Künstler. Illustrierte Monatsschrift für bildende Kunst und Kunstgewerbe. Verlag von Bruno Cassirer, Berlin 1903 (Jg. 1), S. 331–338.
- Günter Meißner: Hans Baluschek. Verlag der Kunst, Dresden 1985.
- Friedrich Wendel: Hans Baluschek – Eine Monographie. Dietz Nachf., Berlin 1924.
