= City of Workers =

1920 painting by Hans Baluschek

- Arbeiterstadt (German)
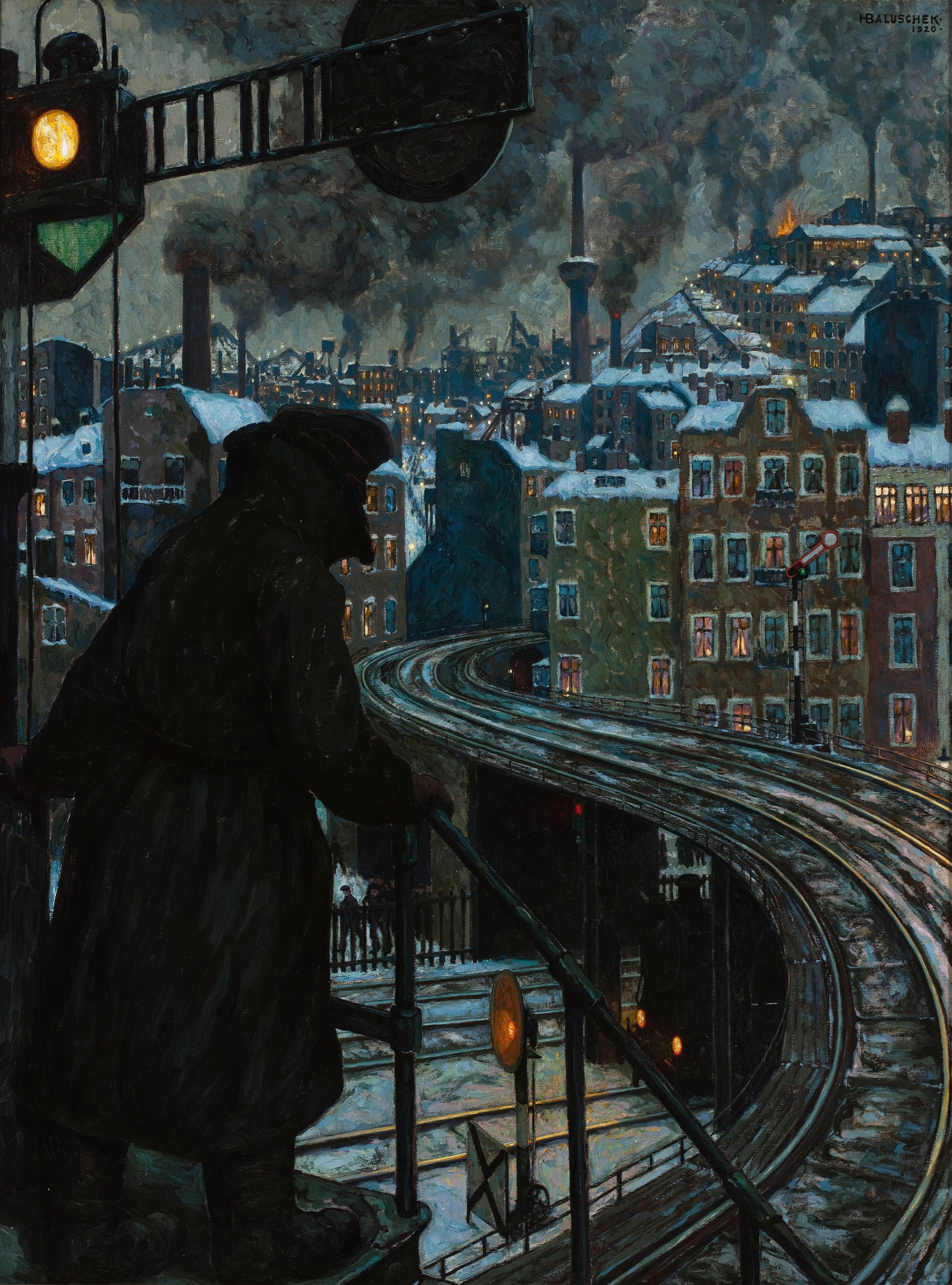
- Artist: Hans Baluschek
- Year: 1920
- Medium: Oil on canvas
- Dimensions: 123 cm × 92.1 cm (48 7/16 in × 36 1/4 in)
- Location: Milwaukee Art Museum, Milwaukee

City of Workers (German: Arbeiterstadt), also translated as Working-Class City, is a 1920 oil painting on canvas completed by the Berlin Secession painter Hans Baluschek. The work is in the collection of the Milwaukee Art Museum.

== Description ==
This oil painting on canvas depicts a working class sector of the German capital, Berlin, in which industrial smoke dominates the skyline and the few lights of windows are drowned in the gloom. The workers' homes are concentrated in the background, while the foreground is dominated by train tracks and the white (back) light of a railway signal. In the lower left corner, standing on a train car, is a dark figure shown in such little detail to almost be a silhouette wearing a coat and a hat, its back to the viewer. The figure appears to be looking over the city and its oppressive tight spaces.

== Completion and analysis ==
An artist from Breslau, Hans Baluschek (1870–1935) was the son of a railway engineer who had been active in the Social Democratic Party of Germany. He completed City of Workers in 1920, two years after Germany's defeat in World War I. A member of the Berlin Secession, Baluschek used an emotional technique similar to the German Expressionists in his work, but remained influenced by Realist subject matter. The city-scape, with its contradictory beauty and despair, was a common subject of his.

Art historian Catherine Sawinski describes City of Workers as "a powerful critique of what political and social issues can do to ordinary citizens", one which depicts Berlin as "a menacing and dehumanizing force". Baluschek was a proponent for workers rights and himself a member of the Social Democratic Party.

== Provenance ==
City of Workers was once owned by Prince Wilhelm Victor of Prussia. Later owners included collectors in Rotterdam and The Hague. In 2006, the painting—expected to bring €15,000 to €20,000—was sold at Sotheby's Amsterdam for €95,000 (US$126,254) to an American collector. This was a record for a work by Baluschek. The painting was purchased by the Milwaukee Art Museum in 2010 from the Munich auction house Karl & Faber.
