= Sveshnikov =

Sveshnikov is a surname. Notable people with the surname include:

- Aleksei Georgievich Sveshnikov (1924–2022), Russian mathematical physicist
- Evgeny Sveshnikov (1950–2021), Latvian, former Soviet International Grandmaster of chess and chess writer
- German Sveshnikov (1937–2003), Soviet fencer
- Boris Sveshnikov (1927–1998), Russian, Soviet non-conformist painter

== See also ==
- Sicilian Defence, Sveshnikov Variation, a chess opening named for Evgeny Sveshnikov
- Svechnikov, a surname
