= Danja Akulin =

Russian visual artist (born 1977)

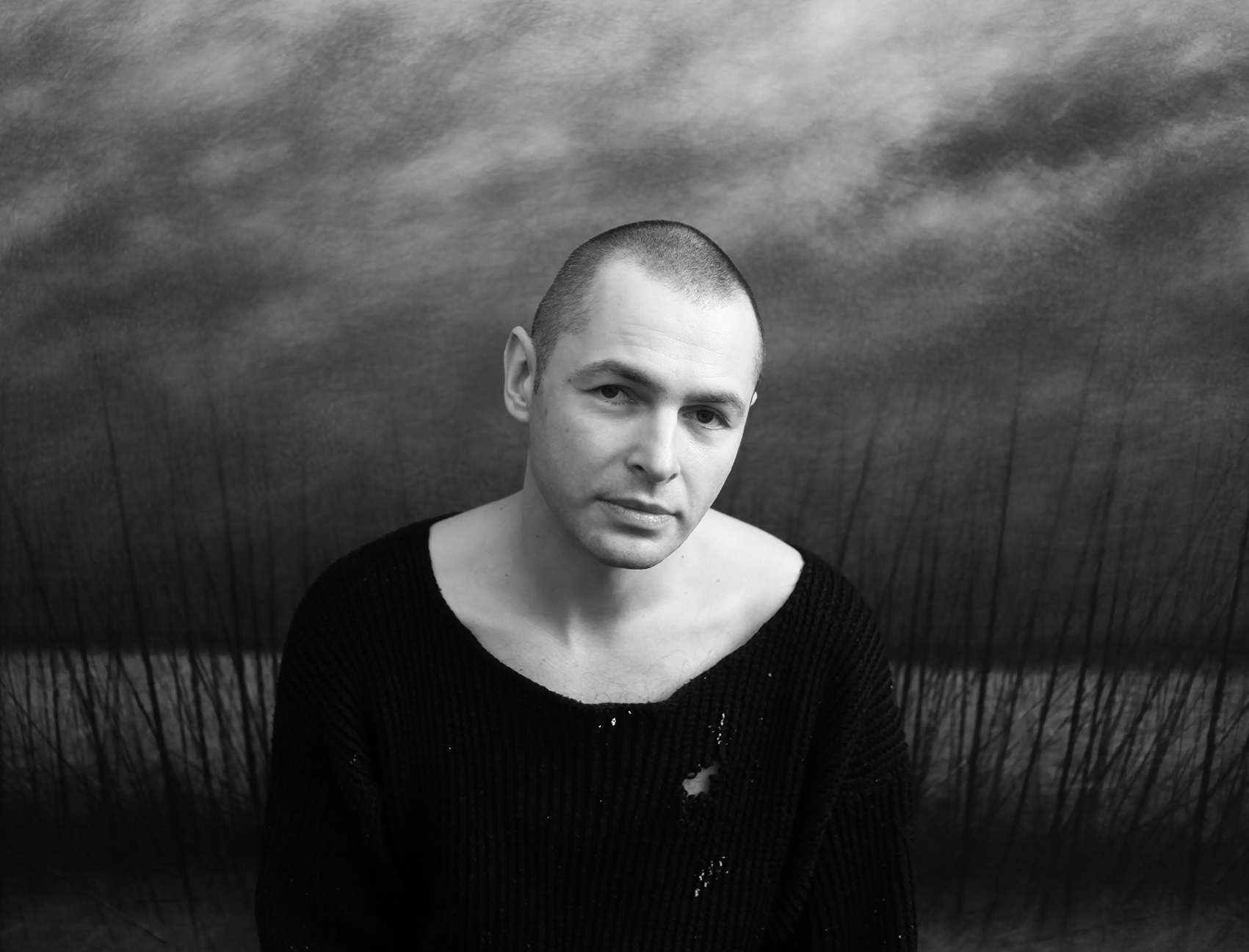
- Born: December 6, 1977 (age 48)
- Education: Berlin University of the Arts 2005 - 2006, Advanced MFA, University of Arts (UdK), Department of Fine Arts, Prof. Daniel Richter, Berlin, Germany 2000-2005 BFA, University of Arts (UdK), Department of Fine Arts, Prof. Georg Baselitz, Berlin, Germany
- Known for: Artist
- Awards: Elizabeth Greenshields Foundation
- Website: danjaakulin.com

Danja Akulin (Даня Акулин) (born 1977) is a Russian visual artist. He rose to prominence by creating large format pencil drawings that reinstate this genre's autonomous value.

Born and raised in Leningrad (St.Petersburg), Russia, he lives and works in Berlin, Germany. He attended bachelor and master studies in Fine Arts, at the Berlin University of the Arts (UdK) and studied under the supervision of Georg Baselitz and Daniel Richter.

Georg Baselitz says of the artist "Danja Akulin creates conceptual drawings, which he calls 'aesthetically minimalist'. Since they come from St. Petersburg, they look different from equally conceptual art by Californian artist Ed Ruscha, for example. After looking at his pictures, it is particularly exciting to see with your own eyes how many watts are used to light a stairwell in St. Petersburg. This is what good drawings look like."

For most of his works, Danja Akulin relies on materials such as graphite, charcoal and pencil. When it comes to his large-sized canvas works, he varies the thickness and fineness of the lines to create a fusion and dissolution of contours. In the same way most painters relate to colors, Akulin uses the texture of his drawings as his artistic means of expression.

Over the years, he developed a technique of mounting paper onto canvas, allowing his drawings to be stretched like paintings. This approach, which he has described as the result of a long process of technical refinement, enables his works to be displayed without glass and emphasizes their material qualities.

Akulin was awarded the Elizabeth Greenshields Foundation Scholarship.

Art Council of the German Bundestag chaired by the President of the Bundestag made a decision to include Akulin's artwork to The Bundestag's art collection. "

Akulin is also noted for creating several artist's books. Between 2007 and 2022 he produced artist's books:

- "Penumbra". Charcoal and graphite drawings from 2010 to 2022. Munich, Gallery and publishing house J.J. Heckenhauer, 2022
- "Penumbra". London, Erarta Galleries, 2012
- "Signs". Moscow, Triumph Gallery, 2007
- "Survival craft". Moscow, Moscow Museum of Modern Art, 2007

== Work ==
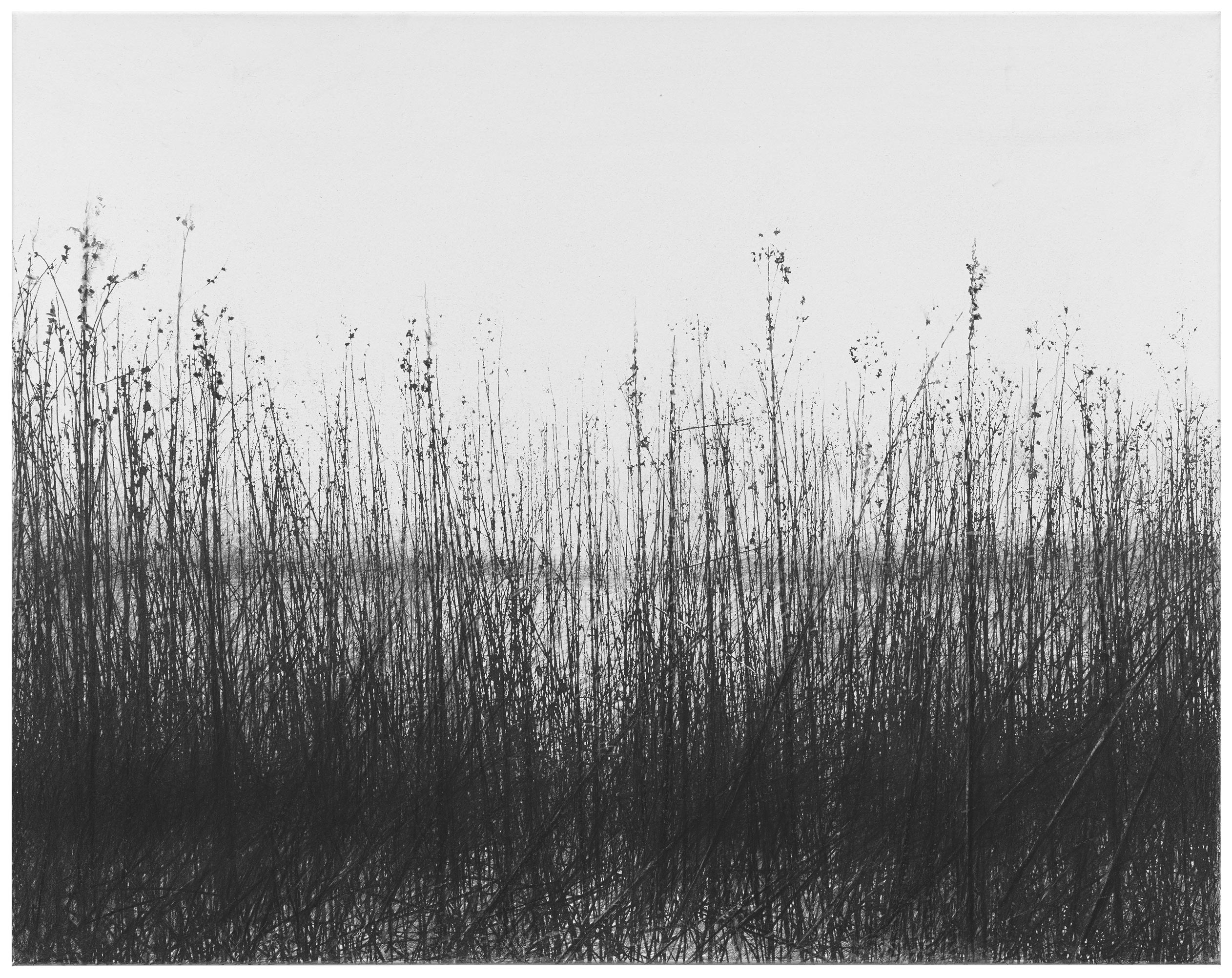
Untitled, 2012, charcoal on canvas, 150 x 200 cm

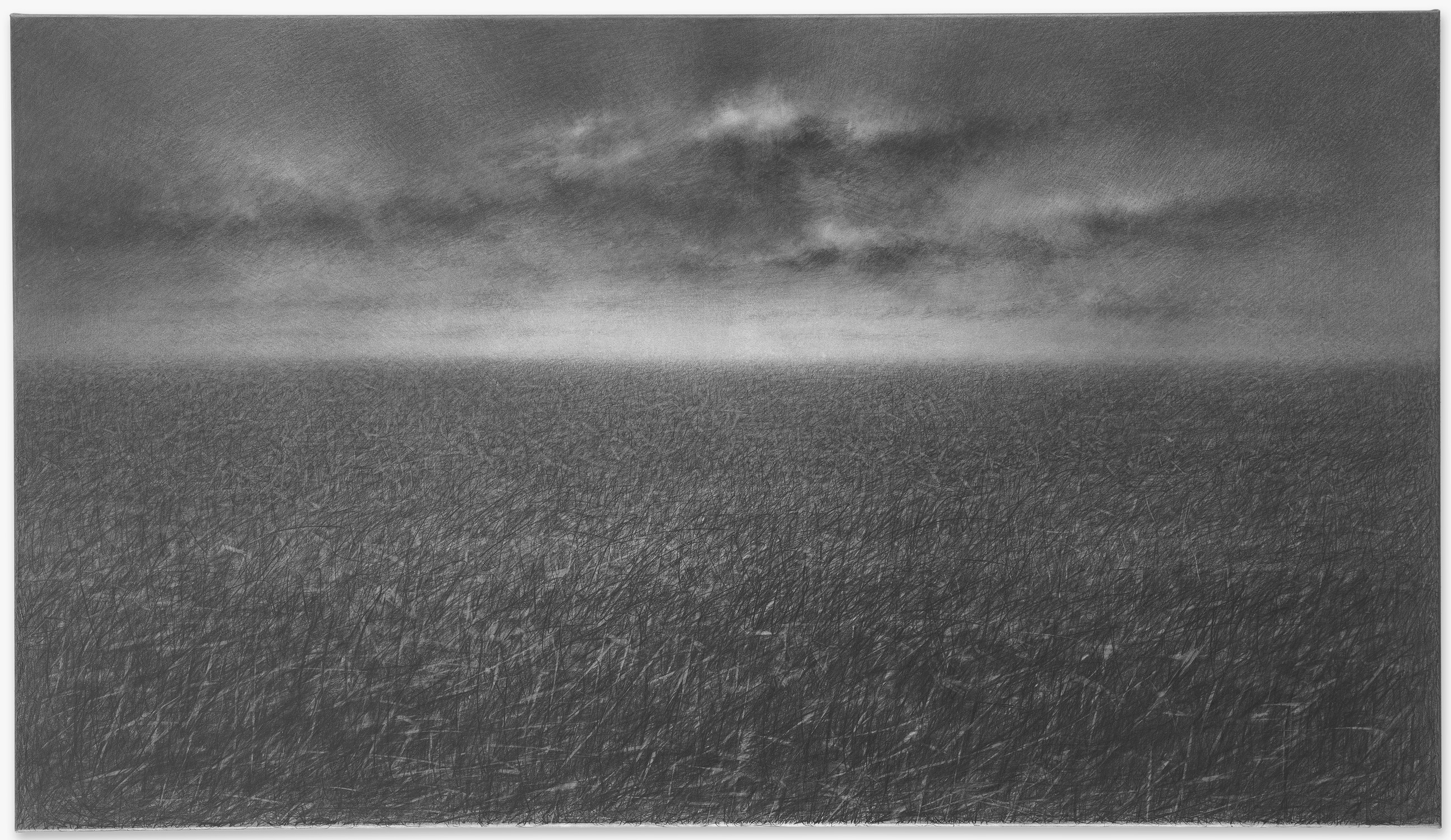
Untitled, 2020, pencil and graphite on paper laid down on canvas, 80 x 140

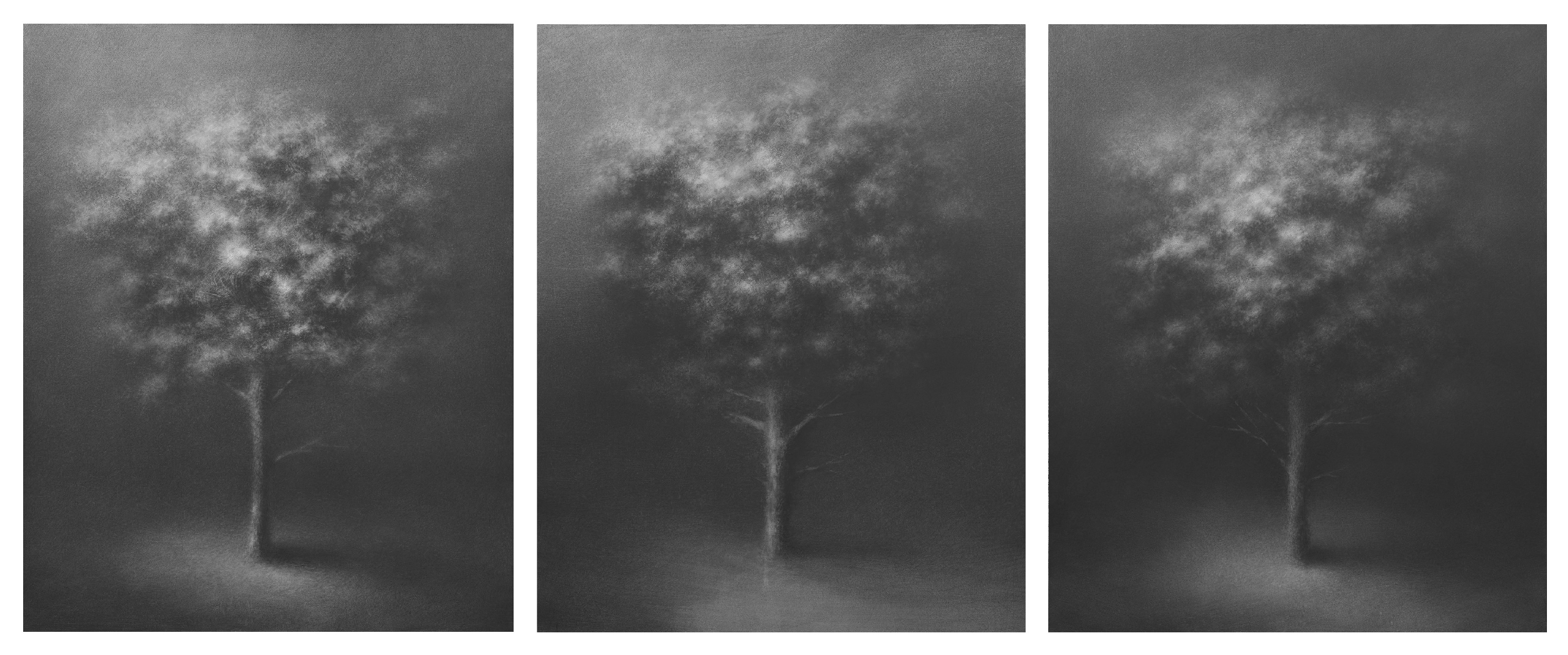
Untitled, 2016, graphite/pencil on paper laid down on canvas, 142 x 115 cm each

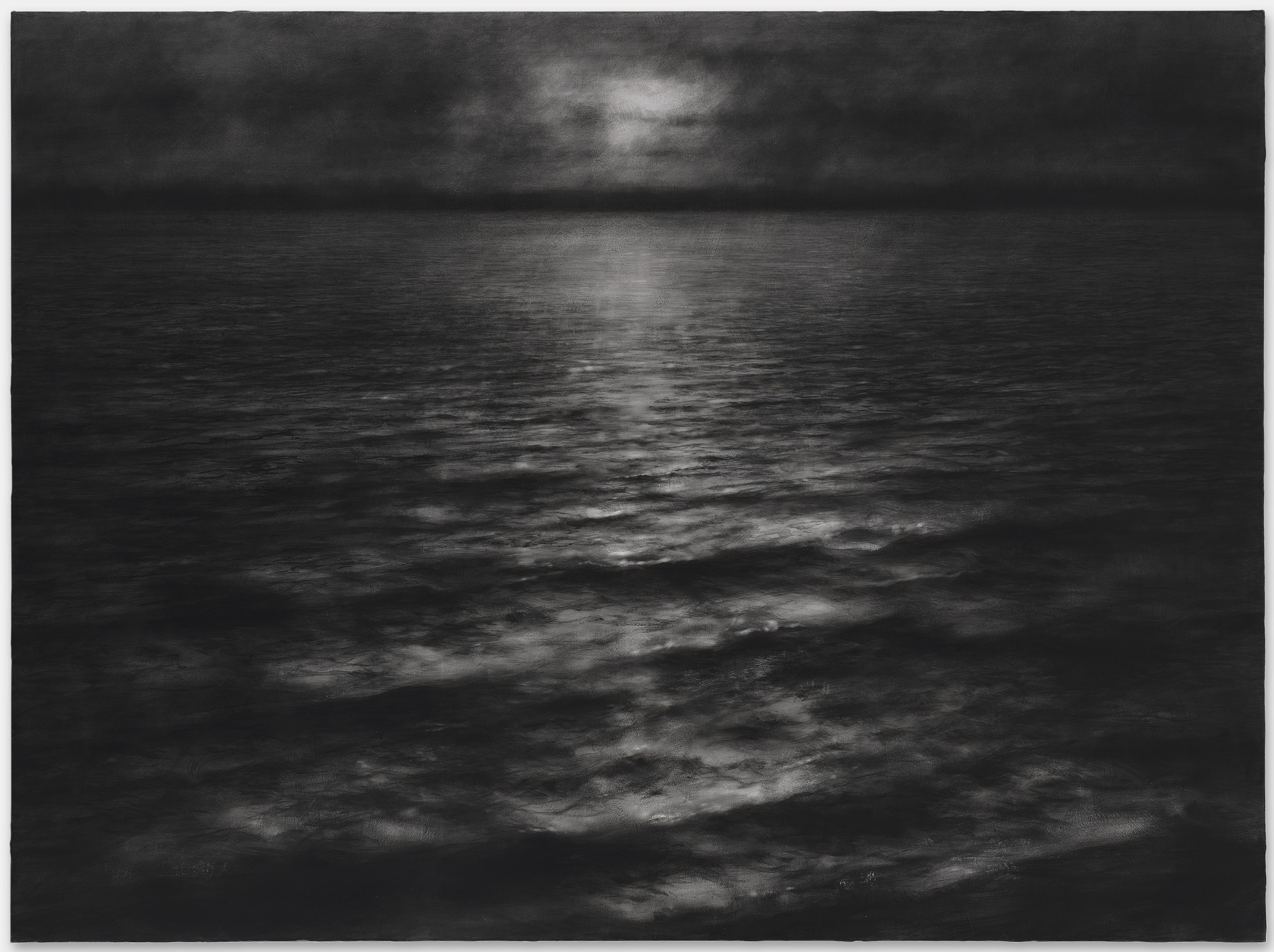
Untitled, 2020, charcoal on canvas, 190 x 260cm

=== Penumbra ===
The word penumbra is often rendered "half-light." The Latin origin paene umbra literally means almost shadow. In between the shadow and the light there is a zone through which we may see what is in the penumbra, but we see it with this darkened hue, and it is problematic to say whether it is illuminated or not. In "Penumbra" series the light is radiated on to what is but a partially illuminated landscape. Through this light, emotions and thoughts within the duality of darkness and brightness are visually translated. The truth exists in the "in-between" area, the penumbra.

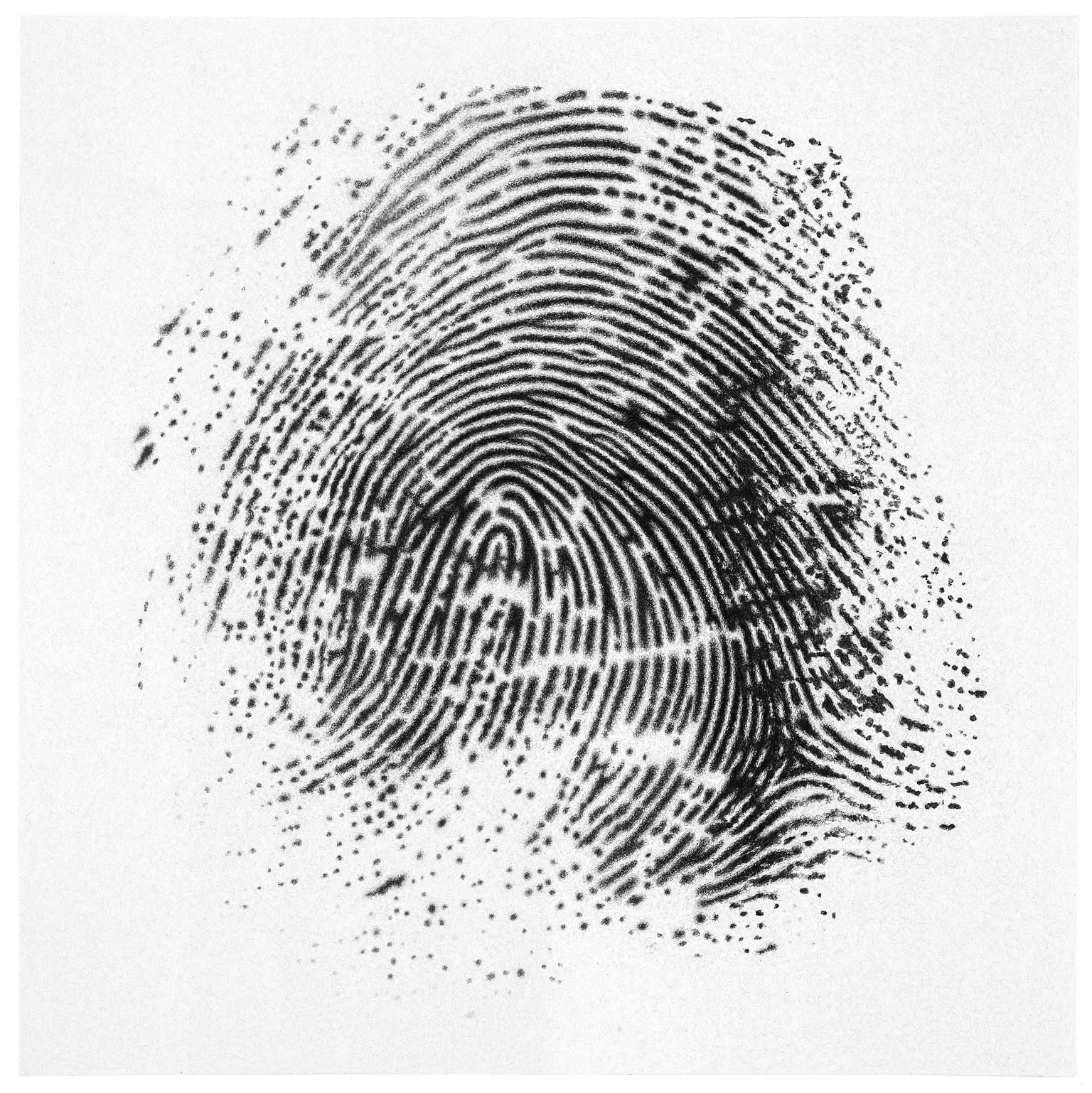
Identity, 2007, pencil on paper laid down on canvas, 145 x 145 cm

=== Signs ===
The Signs series combines detailed external drawing with more introspective elemnts. It incorporates motifs referred to as segno di Dio and uses symbol drawn from contemporary visual culture, including electronic displays, official emblems and elements of urban and domestic graphic design. In these works, such symbols are interpreted and presented with renewed emphasis.

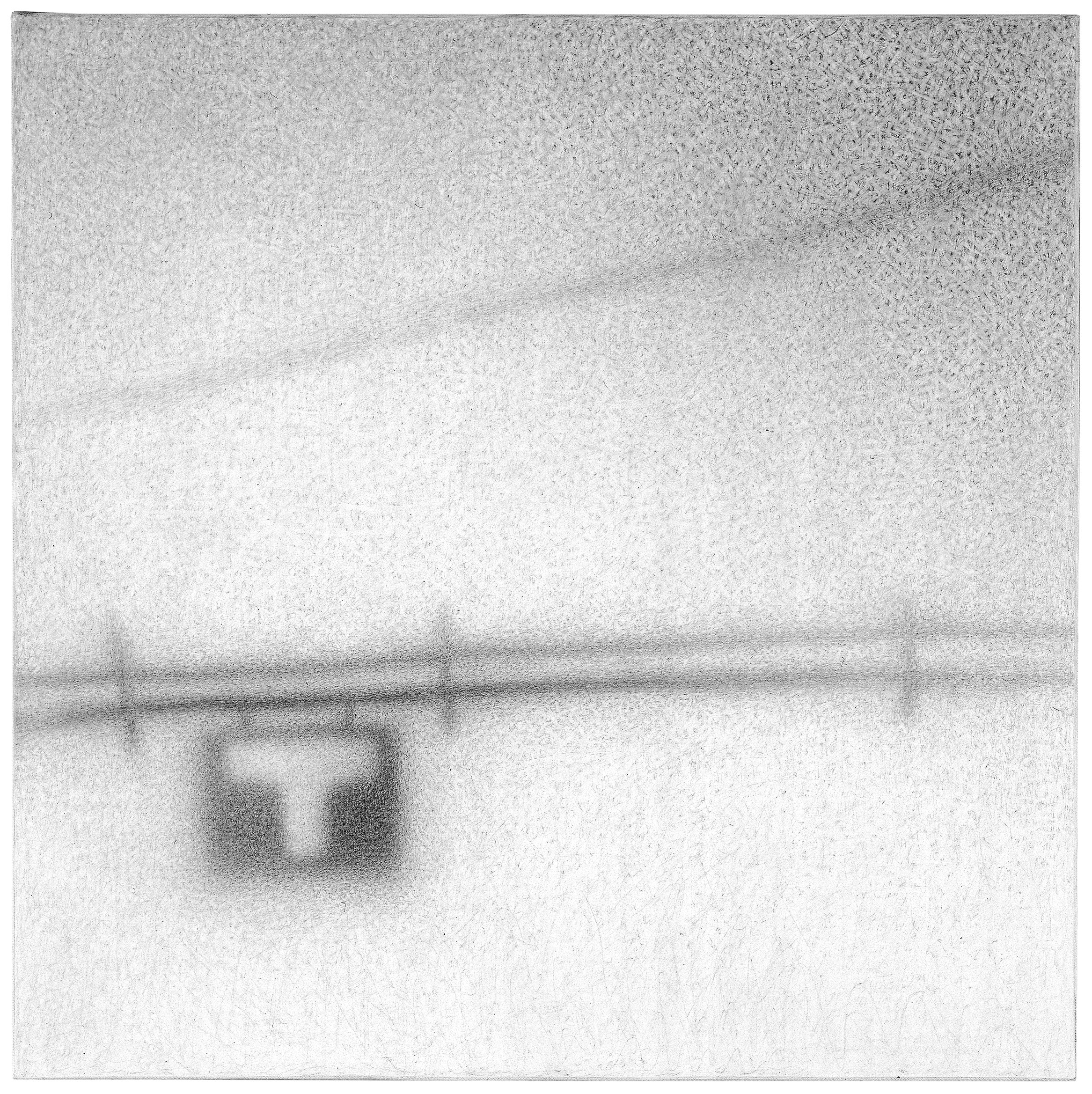
T, 2003, pencil on paper laid down on canvas, 100 x 100 cm

=== Simple Things ===
In "Simple Things" series the focus of attention is on the graphic structure of objects, transposing them to the planning stage, to the sketching stage, and presupposes meditation by the observers. Behind extensive line movements of the pencil, behind concentrations and dilutions of light and shade – associations, sometimes free, sometimes programmed, are revealed layer by layer. The works in these series intend, albeit only to a certain extent, to liberate symbols from their binding meaning, to make them part of the history of drawing.

== Exhibitions ==
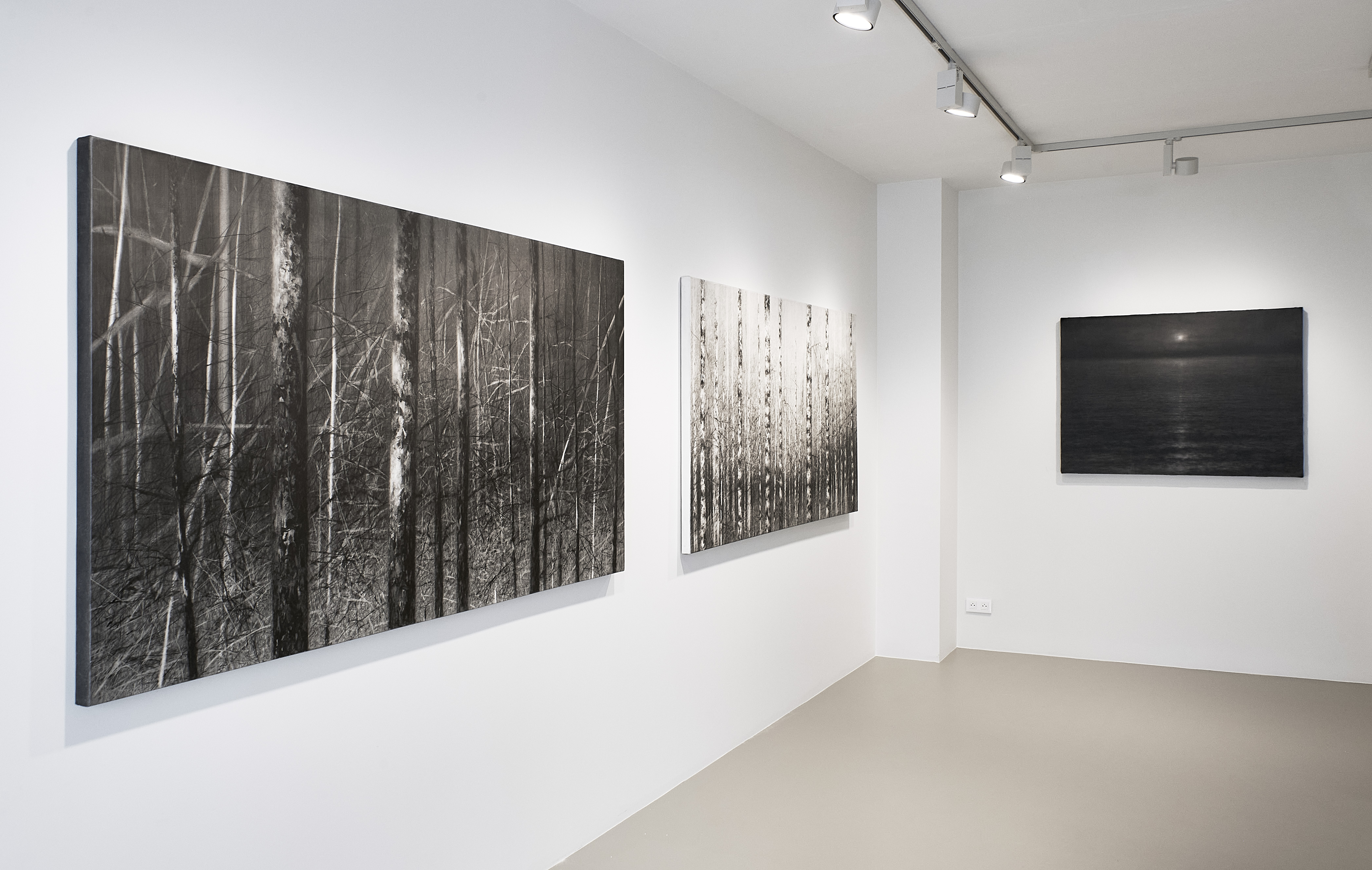
"Between the lines”, exhibition view, In-Gate Gallery, Brussels, 2022

Since 2002 his works were exhibited in numerous galleries and museums throughout Europe and the US, including the German Bundestag (Germany), Bröhan Museum Berlin (Germany), Poll Gallery Berlin (Germany), Mimi Ferzt Gallery NYC (USA), Erarta Gallery London (UK) and Fano Art Museum (Denmark). Akulin' art is also on display in Russia. Among others, his works are exhibited at the Triumph Gallery, the Moscow Center of Art, St. Petersburg Rizzordi Art Foundation and Perm Biennial of Graphic Art.

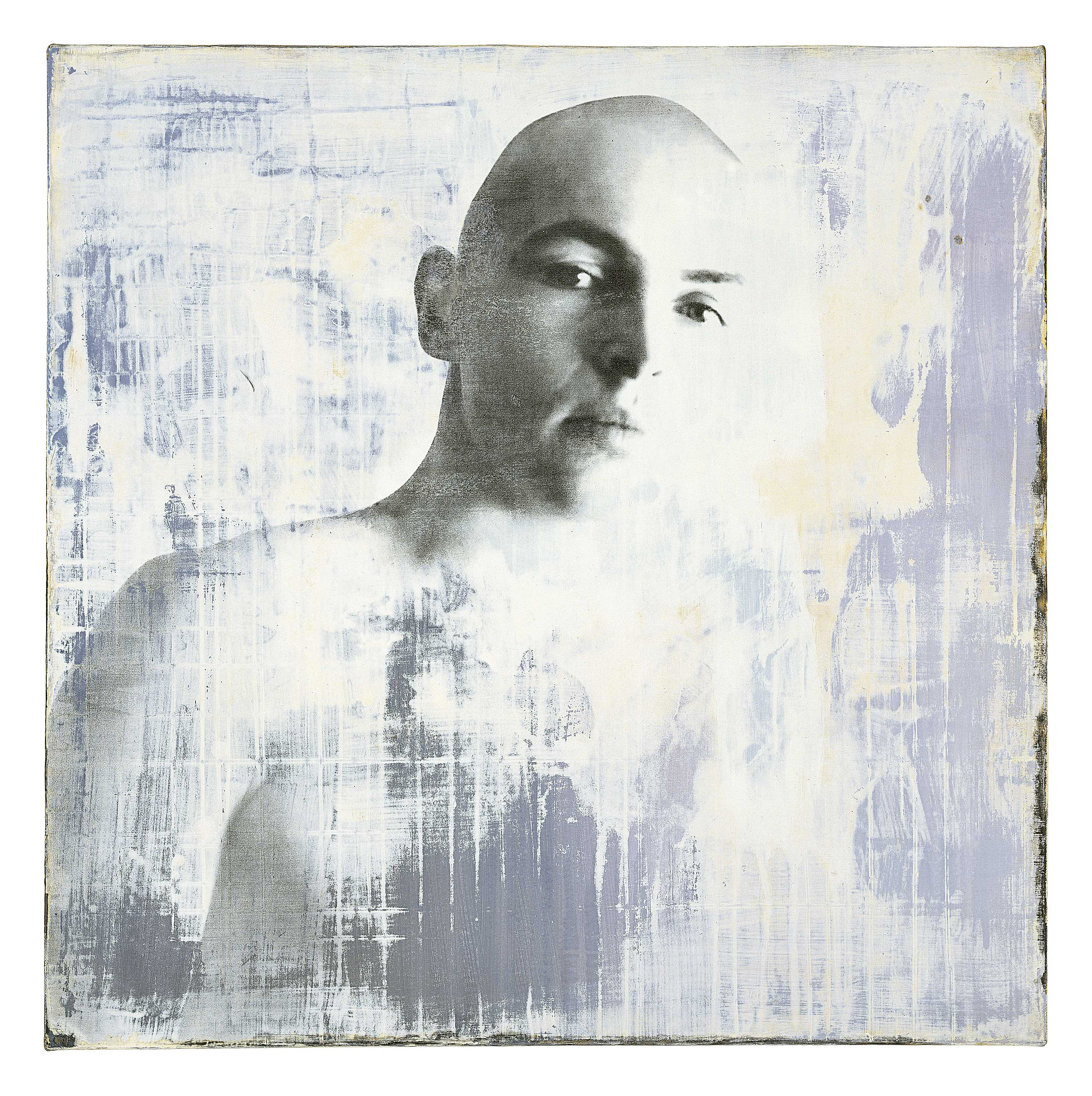
Self-Portrait, 2005, mixed media on paper laid down on canvas, 100 × 100 cm

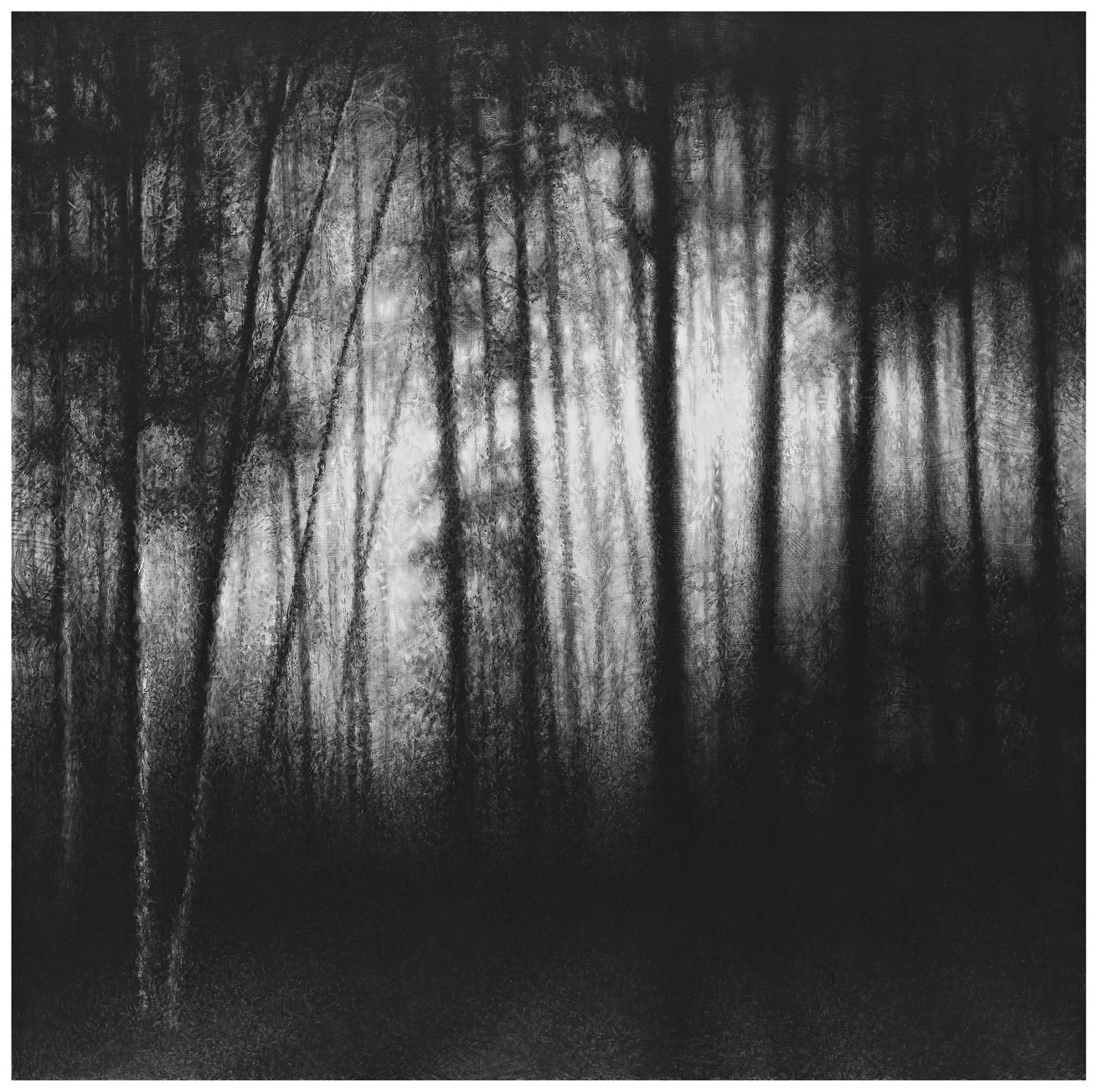
Untitled, 2010, charcoal on canvas, 145 x 145 cm

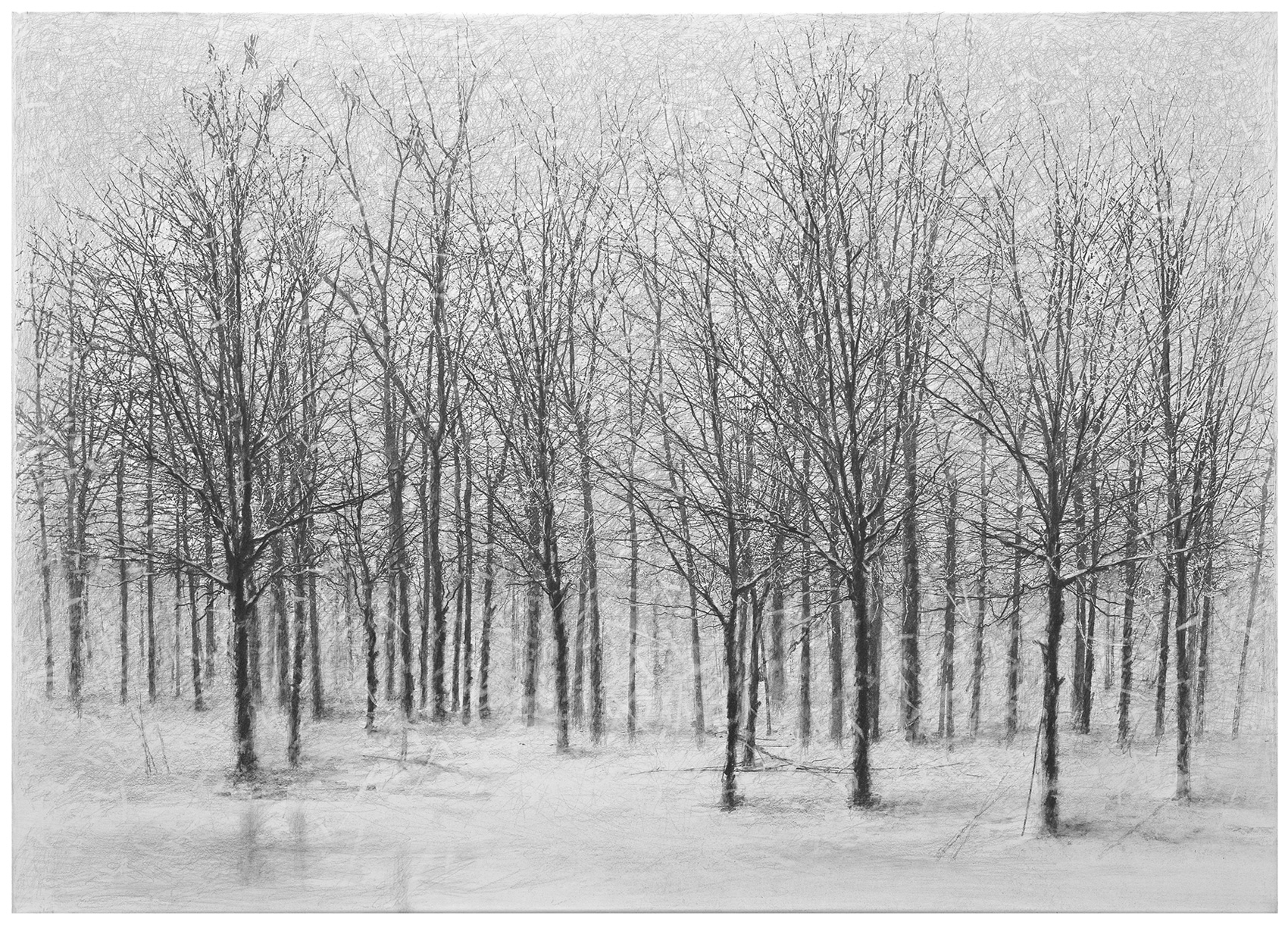
Untitled, 2015, graphite/pencil on paper laid down on canvas, 61 x 85 cm

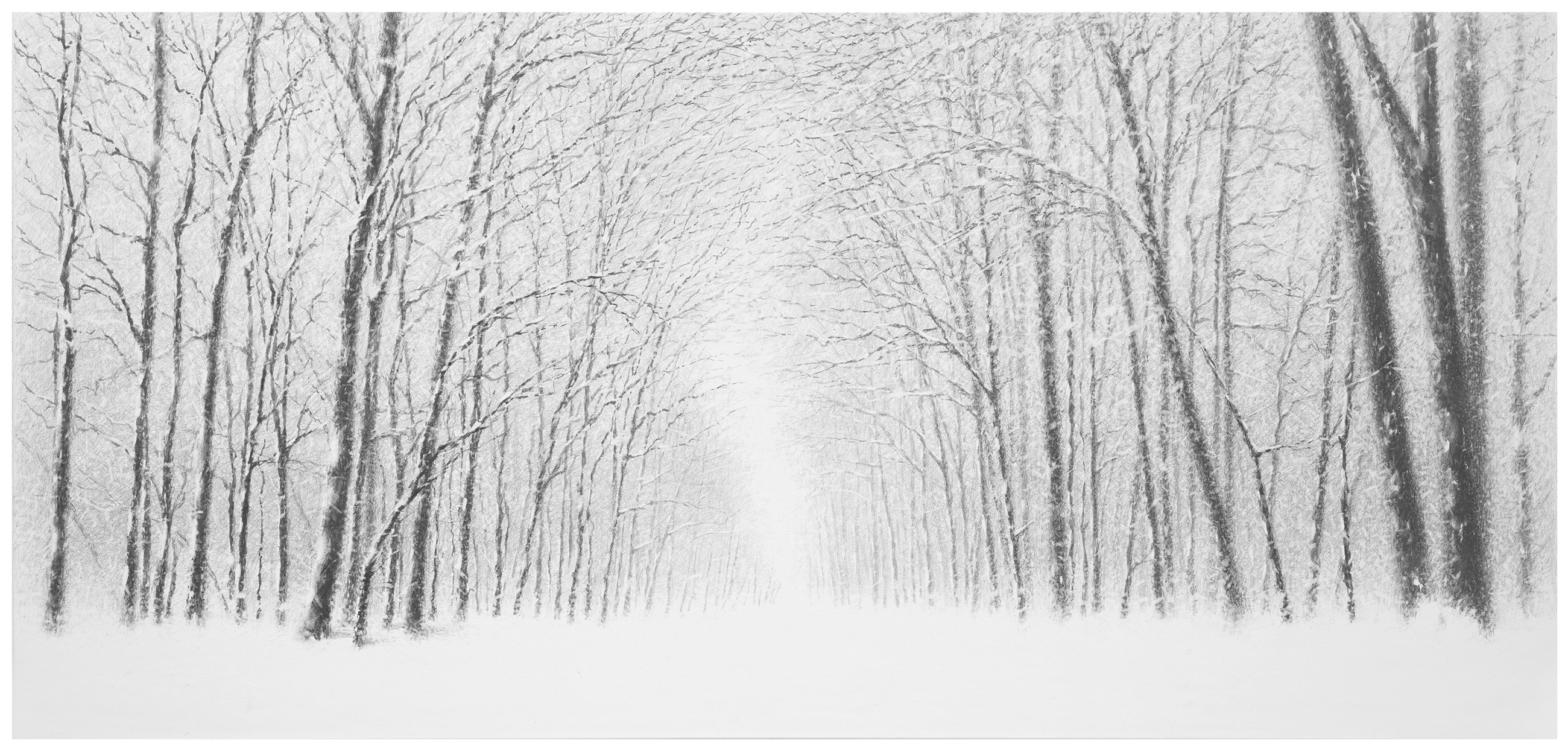
Untitled, 2015 graphite/pencil on paper laid down on canvas, 95 x 200 cm

=== Solo exhibitions ===
- 2023, "Kontrastreich", Poll Gallery, Berlin, Germany
- 2023, "Lightscapes", In-Gate Gallery, Brussels, Belgium
- 2023, "In Darkness Let Me Dwell", Bark Berlin Gallery, Berlin, Germany
- 2022, "Between the Lines", In-Gate Gallery, Brussels, Belgium
- 2022, "Between the Lines", Artbrige Gallery, Berlin, Germany
- 2021, "Penumbra", new works, J.J. Heckenhauer Gallery, Munich, Germany
- 2020, "Rock hard sea", Bark Berlin Gallery, Berlin, Germany
- 2020, Art on Paper, with Elipsis Art, New York, NY, USA
- 2019, "Penumbra", Erarta Museum, St. Petersburg, Russia
- 2018, Art on Paper, Contemporary Drawing Fair, Gallery J.J. Heckenhauer, Brussels, Belgium
- 2018, Gallery J.J. Heckenhauer, Munich, Germany
- 2014, Gallery J.J. Heckenhauer, Munich, Germany
- 2014, "Landscapes", Poll Gallery, Berlin, Germany
- 2013, art KARLSRUHE, One-Artist-Show, Poll Gallery, Berlin, Germany
- 2013, "Charcoal on Canvas", Mimi Ferzt Gallery, New York, USA
- 2012, "Crepusculum", TS Art Projects, Berlin, Germany
- 2012, "Penumbra", Erarta Gallery, London, UK (catalog)
- 2011, "Landscapes", Gallery J.J. Heckenhauer, Brussels, Belgium
- 2010, "V.I.P.R.I.P.", Michael Schultz Gallery, Berlin, Germany
- 2008, Mimi Fertz Gallery, New York, USA
- 2007, "Signs", Triumph Gallery, Moscow, Russia (catalog)
- 2007, "Survival Craft", Moscow Museum of Modern Art, Moscow, Russia (catalog)
- 2004 Gallery "Borkowski", Hannover, Germany (catalog)
- 2002 Gallery "Bellevue", Berlin, Germany

=== Group exhibitions ===
- 2023, "The end of painting", Bröhan Museum, Berlin Germany
- 2022, "Salon Nr. 4", Christine Knauber Gallery, Berlin, Germany
- 2020, 50/50: The Matter of Duality, Paul-Fleischmann-Haus, Berlin, Germany
- 2019, "Preparing for Darkness vol. 4: True Romance", Kühlhaus, Berlin, Germany
- 2019, "erinnern-treümen-zeichnen", Poll Gallery, Berlin, Germany
- 2018, "A Sign of Nature", W Gallery, Osnabrück, Germany
- 2018, Kunst und Filmbiennale Worpswede 2018, Worpswede, Germany
- 2018, "Shadow", Thielbeer.Art & Holger Kuhn Fine Arts, Berlin, Germany
- 2018, "Preparing for Darkness", Kühlhaus, Berlin, Germany
- 2018, "Salon Nr. 2", Christine Knauber Gallery, Berlin, Germany
- 2017, Salon der Gegenwart, Hamburg, Germany (catalog)
- 2017, "This is The Sea", Fanø Kunstmuseum, Denmark (catalog)
- 2016, "Salon No. 1", Galerie Christine Knauber, Berlin, Germany
- 2016, "Under Cover", Artdocks Gallery, Bremen, Germany
- 2015, "Playing Pool With a Rope", Metropol Park, Berlin, Germany
- 2015, "Neu Gold", Dortmunder U, Dortmund, Germany
- 2014, "Strictness and Beauty", Ural Vision Gallery, Yekaterinburg, Russia
- 2014, 6. Biennale der Zeichnung, Kunstverein Eislingen, Germany
- 2012, "Auf der ewigen Reise", E.ON AG, Düsseldorf, Germany (catalog)
- 2012, "With Pencil and Crayon", Poll Gallery, Berlin, Germany
- 2011, "(Moving) Identities", Gallery JJ Heckenhauer, Tübingen, Germany
- 2011, "Monte Verità", Kunstverein Familie Montez, Frankfurt a. M. / Germany
- 2011, "Expression Beyond", Rizzordi Art Foundation, St. Petersburg, Russia
- 2010, Boomerang, Perm Biennial of Graphic Arts, Perm Museum of Contemporary Art, Russia
- 2010, ART.FAIR 21, MESSE FÜR AKTUELLE KUNST, Michael Schultz Gallery, Köln, Germany
- 2010, Munich Contempo, Michael Schultz Gallery, Munich, Germany
- 2010, Art Paris, Michael Schultz Gallery, Paris, France
- 2009, Mimi Fertz Gallery, New York, USA
- 2007, Sputnik. New Painting from Berlin, Gallery Claudius, Hamburg, Germany
- 2005, Nord Art 2005, Rendsburg, Germany
- 2005, Art Frankfurt, Subjective Obsessions, special show of the Gallery Michael Schultz, Frankfurt, Germany (catalog)
- 2004, KPM - Offenhallen, Berlin
- 2004, "Identity in the Digital Era", Künstlerhaus Bethanien, Berlin, Germany (catalog)
- 2004, Kunstverein, Uelzen, Germany
- 2004, Gallery Apex, Göttingen, Germany
- 2003, Horst-Janssen-Museum, Oldenburg, Germany (catalog)
- 2003, Gallery Annelie Grimm-Beickert, Bamberg, Germany
- 2003, Gallery Helmut Leger, Munich, Germany
- 2003, "Insights", The Baselitz Class, Gallere Michael Schultz, Berlin, Germany (catalog)
- 2002, Art Summer 2002. Kunstverein, Oberhausen, Germany

== External links and reviews ==
- Official website: http://www.danjaakulin.com
- In-Gate Gallery. Danja Akulin: https://ingategallery.com/artists/31-danja-akulin/works/
- Artist on Singulart.com: https://www.singulart.com/en/artist/danja-akulin-704
- Poll Gallery. Danja Akulin: https://poll-berlin.de/galerie/en/gallery-artists/danja-akulin/
- Artist on Artsy: https://www.artsy.net/artist/danja-akulin
- The End of painting. Bröhan Museum: https://www.broehan-museum.de/en/exhibition/the-end-of-painting-karl-hagemeister-and-painting-today/
- Danja Akulin. About the artist: https://www.galleristic.com/en/buy-art/danja-akulin
- Focus on the painter Danja Akulin. Interview with Danja Akulin: https://www.singulart.com/en/blog/2018/03/09/focus-on-the-painter-danja-akulin/
- Penumbra.Review by Diego Giolitti: https://www.huffingtonpost.co.uk/diego-giolitti/penumbra_b_1529701.html
- "The Magic of The Horizon": http://www.tagesspiegel.de/kultur/landschaftskunst-danja-akulin-und-lucas-arruda-die-magie-des-horizonts/11181282.html
- "Nature In Light": https://muenchenphoto.wordpress.com/2014/12/20/natur-im-licht/
- "Who Needs Color": http://www.artparasites.com/who-needs-color/
- Danja Akulin: "Penumbra" at Erarta Gallery, review by Theodora Clarke: http://www.russianartandculture.com/review-danja-akulin-penumbra-at-erarta-gallery-by-theodora-clarke/
- "Picture Preview. Danja Akulin's 'Penumbra'": https://www.independent.co.uk/arts-entertainment/art/features/picture-preview-danja-akulins-penumbra-7851047.html
- "Penumbra: A new Exhibition by Danja Akulin Opens at Erarta Galleries London": http://artdaily.com/index.asp?int_sec=2&int_new=56003&b=basel#.V_-Z_ty1zW4
- "Darkening - 1 (Shadow and Light)": http://www.verbunkos.org/2012/12/darkening-1-shadow-and-light.html
- In Darkness Let Me Dwell: https://www.artatberlin.com/en/d-akulin-m-piech-i-in-darkness-let-me-dwell-i-bark-berlin-gallery-i-20-01-09-02-2023/
