= Danja =

Danja may refer to:

- Danja (food), a variety of Korean rice cake
- Danja (record producer), American record producer; real name Floyd Nathaniel Hills
- Danja, Nigeria, a local government area in Katsina state

== People with the given name ==
- Danja Akulin (born 1977), Russian artist
- Danja Haslacher, Austrian alpine skier
- Danja Müsch (born 1971), German beach volleyball player

== See also ==
- Danjia (disambiguation)
