= Svechnikov =

Svechnikov (Russian: Свечников) is a Russian masculine surname derived from the word свечник (svechnik, meaning "chandler"). Its feminine counterpart is Svechnikova. It may refer to:

- Anastasiya Svechnikova (born 1992), Uzbekistani javelin thrower
- Andrei Svechnikov (born 2000), Russian ice hockey forward
- Evgeny Svechnikov (born 1996), Russian ice hockey forward
- Mikhail Svechnikov (1882–1938), Russian military officer

== See also ==
- Sveshnikov
