= Danjia =

Danjia may refer to:

- Danjia Township, a township in Cangyuan Va Autonomous County, Yunan, China
- Tanka people, an ethnic subgroup in Southern coastal China who lived on junks

== See also ==
- Danja (disambiguation)
