= Boris Sveshnikov =

Russian painter

Boris Petrovich Sveshnikov
- Born: 1 February 1927; Moscow, Russia
- Died: 6 October 1998 (aged 71); Moscow, Russia
- Education: Moscow Institute of Applied and Decorative Arts
- Known for: Painting, drawing

Boris Petrovich Sveshnikov (1927–1998) was a Russian nonconformist painter. On February 9, 1946, Sveshnikov, then a nineteen-year-old art school student at the Moscow Institute of Applied and Decorative Arts, went to buy kerosene in a nearby shop. On the way, he was arrested for participating in a terrorist group preparing an assassination attempt on Josef Stalin. One of the participants in this fabricated MGB accusation was the artist Lev Kropyvnytsky, with whom Sveshnikov studied at the institute. Before his so-called trial, Sveshnikov spent a year in prison. Subjected to endless night interrogations, trips from the basements of Lubyanka to Lefortovo Prison and back, sleep deprivation, and jail overcrowding, inevitably brought Sveshnikov to the brink of physical and nervous exhaustion. After a year, he was sentenced to eight-years in maximum security labor camps.

== Life ==
The way from Moscow to Ukhtizhemlag (in the Ukhta-Izhvesk region)—through many transit prisons—lasted more than a month. In the crowded Stolypin wagons, Sveshnikov met with officers of the Vlasov army, Soviet prisoners of war, bandits and other criminals, members of forbidden religious sects, as well as political prisoners, who like Sveshnikov were branded “terrorists.”

In Camp 15, one of many camps in the Gulag Archipelago, Sveshnikov spent about two and a half years. The prisoners at the camp were forced to work for ten to twelve hours a day in digging and laying gas pipelines, regardless of the freezing temperatures in winter which reached −40 °C (−40 °F) and regardless of the clouds of blood-sucking biting midges. He lasted about two years, after which he collapsed from extreme exhaustion and was written off as a "waste of production" in the camp hospital along with other "goners" doomed to die. Fortunateley, a friend of his family, geologist Nikolai Nikolaevich Tikhonovich, who had been in the camp in 1937, and at one time supervised the geological work in the Ukhtizhemlag system, retained some professional ties there and intervened on Sveshnikov's behalf. Sometime in the fall of 1948, he was transferred to the Vetlosyan camp for "invalids" and was appointed night watchman at a woodworking factory. The nature of this position gave him an opportunity to produce a number of drawings in pencil and ink on paper that today comprise an important part of his oevre. In the night watchman's closet, secretly, at night, Sveshnikov began to paint. His proximity to a nearby painting workshop where three prisoners served the "aesthetic needs" of the camp, i.e., preparation of banners, poster design, and painting portraits of Stalin, allowed him to obtain some art materials. Sometimes “clients” came to him, and on small pieces of paper he painted their portraits, which the prisoners then sent in letters to their relatives. In 1954 Sveshnikov was released.

Following his release, Sveshnikov continued to work in the fantastic realism style that he had developed in the Siberian labor camps. Oddly and perhaps sarcastically, Sveshnikov recalled the camp years as a period of “absolute free creativity.” “I got my ration of bread and painted what I wanted. Nobody supervised me. Nobody showed any interest in me.” Despite the injustices done to him by the government and despite the fact that Sveshnikov is considered a powerful exponent of Soviet nonconformist art, the artist never perceived himself as a dissident. On the contrary, Sveshnikov's work is largely personal and apolitical. As the artist once stated, “What I painted at home I did for myself... All of my works are dedicated to the grave.”

Boris Sveshnikov's paintings have been exhibited at the Galerie Moscou-Petersburg in Paris (1979), The Musée Russe in Exil in Montgeron, France (1979), the Museum of Soviet Unofficial Art in Exile in Jersey City (1981), the Cannon and Russell Rotundas on Capitol Hill (1983), the Meerbuscher Culture Center in Meerbusch, Germany (1984), the National Museum of Modern Art in Paris (1988), and Mimi Ferzt Gallery in New York City (1999). Some of Boris Sveshnikov's most important works are found in the Norton and Nancy Dodge Collection of Nonconformist Art from the Soviet Union, currently housed in the Zimmerli Art Museum at Rutgers University.
