= Sicilian Defence, Sveshnikov Variation =

Chess opening

Sveshnikov Variation
Position: a8 black rook, c8 black bishop, d8 black queen, e8 black king, f8 black bishop, h8 black rook, a7 black pawn, b7 black pawn, d7 black pawn, f7 black pawn, g7 black pawn, h7 black pawn, c6 black knight, f6 black knight, e5 black pawn, d4 white knight, e4 white pawn, c3 white knight, a2 white pawn, b2 white pawn, c2 white pawn, f2 white pawn, g2 white pawn, h2 white pawn, a1 white rook, c1 white bishop, d1 white queen, e1 white king, f1 white bishop, h1 white rook
- Moves: 1.e4 c5 2.Nf3 Nc6 3.d4 cxd4 4.Nxd4 Nf6 5.Nc3 e5
- ECO: B33
- Named after: Evgeny Sveshnikov
- Parent: Open Sicilian
- Synonym: Lasker–Pelikan Variation

The Sveshnikov Variation, also known as the Lasker–Pelikan Variation, is a variation of the Sicilian Defence that begins with the moves:

1. e4 c5
2. Nf3 Nc6
3. d4 cxd4
4. Nxd4 Nf6
5. Nc3 e5

The move 5...e5 kicks White's knight from d4, but leaves Black with a backwards d-pawn and a weakness on d5, but affords dynamic potential for Black, who gets a central foothold and gains time on White's knight, which often ends up driven to the edge of the board. Though some lines still give Black trouble, it has been established as a first-rate defence.

The Sveshnikov Variation was pioneered by its namesake Evgeny Sveshnikov and Gennadi Timoshchenko in the 1970s. Before this, it only saw occasional play: Emanuel Lasker played it once in his world championship match against Carl Schlechter, and Jorge Pelikan played it a few times in the 1950s, but Sveshnikov's treatment of the variation was the key to its revitalization. Today, it is extremely popular among grandmasters and amateurs alike. Top players who have used this variation include Magnus Carlsen, Vladimir Kramnik, Veselin Topalov, and many others.

== Main line: 6.Ndb5 ==
The main line after 5...e5 runs as follows:

6.Ndb5

The theoretically critical move, threatening Nd6+. All other moves are considered to allow Black easy equality. 6.Nxc6?! is usually met by 6...bxc6, when Black's extra pawn in the centre gives good play; alternatively, even 6...dxc6 7.Qxd8+ Kxd8 is sufficient for equality. 6.Nb3 and 6.Nf3 can be well met by 6...Bb4, threatening to win White's pawn on e4. 6.Nf5 allows 6...d5! 7.exd5 Bxf5 8.dxc6 bxc6 9.Qf3 Qd7. 6.Nde2 can be met by either 6...Bc5 or 6...Bb4.

6...d6

Black does not allow 7.Nd6+ Bxd6 8.Qxd6, when White's pair of bishops gives them the advantage.

7.Bg5

White gets ready to eliminate the knight on f6, further weakening Black's control over the d5-square. A less common alternative is 7.Nd5 Nxd5 8.exd5 Nb8 (or 8...Ne7), when White will try to exploit the queenside pawn majority, while Black will seek counterplay on the kingside.

7...a6

Black forces White's knight back to a3.

8.Na3

The immediate 8.Bxf6 forces 8...gxf6, when after 9.Na3, Black can transpose into the main line with 9...b5 or deviate with 9...f5!?

Position: a8 black rook, c8 black bishop, d8 black queen, e8 black king, f8 black bishop, h8 black rook, f7 black pawn, g7 black pawn, h7 black pawn, a6 black pawn, c6 black knight, d6 black pawn, f6 black knight, b5 black pawn, e5 black pawn, g5 white bishop, e4 white pawn, a3 white knight, c3 white knight, a2 white pawn, b2 white pawn, c2 white pawn, f2 white pawn, g2 white pawn, h2 white pawn, a1 white rook, d1 white queen, e1 white king, f1 white bishop, h1 white rook

Chelyabinsk Variation: 6.Ndb5 d6 7.Bg5 a6 8.Na3 b5

8...b5!

8...b5 was Sveshnikov's innovation, controlling c4 and threatening ...b4 forking White's knights. Previously, Black played 8...Be6 (the Bird Variation), which allowed the a3-knight to return to life with 9.Nc4. The entire variation up to 8...b5 is referred to as the Chelyabinsk Variation. It can also be reached from the alternate move order 1.e4 c5 2.Nf3 e6 3.d4 cxd4 4.Nxd4 Nf6 5.Nc3 Nc6 6.Ndb5 d6 7.Bf4 e5 8.Bg5 a6 9.Na3 b5, which is one move longer. (That alternative move order gives White other alternatives, including 6.Nxc6 bxc6 7.e5 Nd5 8.Ne4, intending c4, and the gambit 6.Be2 Bb4 7.0-0!?, allowing ...Bxc3 8.bxc3 Nxe4.) The move numbers in the following discussion are based on the move order given in bold.

After 8...b5, White usually parries the threat of ...b4 by playing 9.Bxf6 or 9.Nd5.

=== 9.Bxf6 ===
After 9.Bxf6, 9...Qxf6?! 10.Nd5 Qd8 fails to 11.c4 b4 (11...bxc4 12.Nxc4 is good for White, who threatens 13.Qa4) 12.Qa4 Bd7 13.Nb5! axb5 14.Qxa8 Qxa8 15.Nc7+ Kd8 16.Nxa8 and the knight escapes via b6. Thus 9...gxf6 is forced, and White continues 10.Nd5. White's powerful knight on d5 and Black's shattered kingside pawn structure are compensated by Black's bishop pair and White's offside knight on a3. Also, Black has the plan of playing 10...f5, followed by ...fxe4 and ...f5 with the second f-pawn, which would give them good control of the centre. An alternative plan is to play 10...Bg7 followed by ...Ne7 to immediately trade off White's powerful knight; this line is known as the Novosibirsk Variation.

=== 9.Nd5 ===
9.Nd5 tends to lead to quieter play. White decides not to double Black's f-pawns and the game often continues 9...Be7 10.Bxf6 Bxf6 11.c3. This allows White to maintain the knight on d5 by trading off Black's knight on f6, and prepares to bring the knight on a3 back into play with the manoeuvre Na3–c2–e3. Another line is 10.Nxe7 Nxe7! (fighting for control of d5 and not fearing the doubled pawns) 11.Bxf6 gxf6. However, a recent development in the Sveshnikov has been 11.c4 (instead of c3), which often leads to positions where White is pressing for the win at no risk. A quick draw is possible after 9.Nd5 Qa5+!? 10.Bd2 (in order to prevent 10...Nxe4) 10...Qd8 11.Bg5 Qa5+ etc. In order to avoid this, White can play 11.Nxf6+ or 11.c4.

== See also ==
- List of chess openings
- List of chess openings named after people

== Sources ==
- Sveshnikov, Evgeny (1988). Сицилианская защита. Система 5. …e7-e5 [Sicilian Defence. System 5. ...e7-e5.]. Theory of Openings (in Russian). Moscow: Fizkultura i sport. ISBN 5-278-00001-5.
- Timoshchenko, Gennady (2016). Сицилианская защита. Челябинский вариант [Sicilian Defense: Chelyabinsk Variation]. Гроссмейстерский Репертуар (in Russian). Moscow: Russian CHESS House. ISBN 978-5-94693-509-8.
