= Bröhan Museum =

Museum of art and design in Berlin

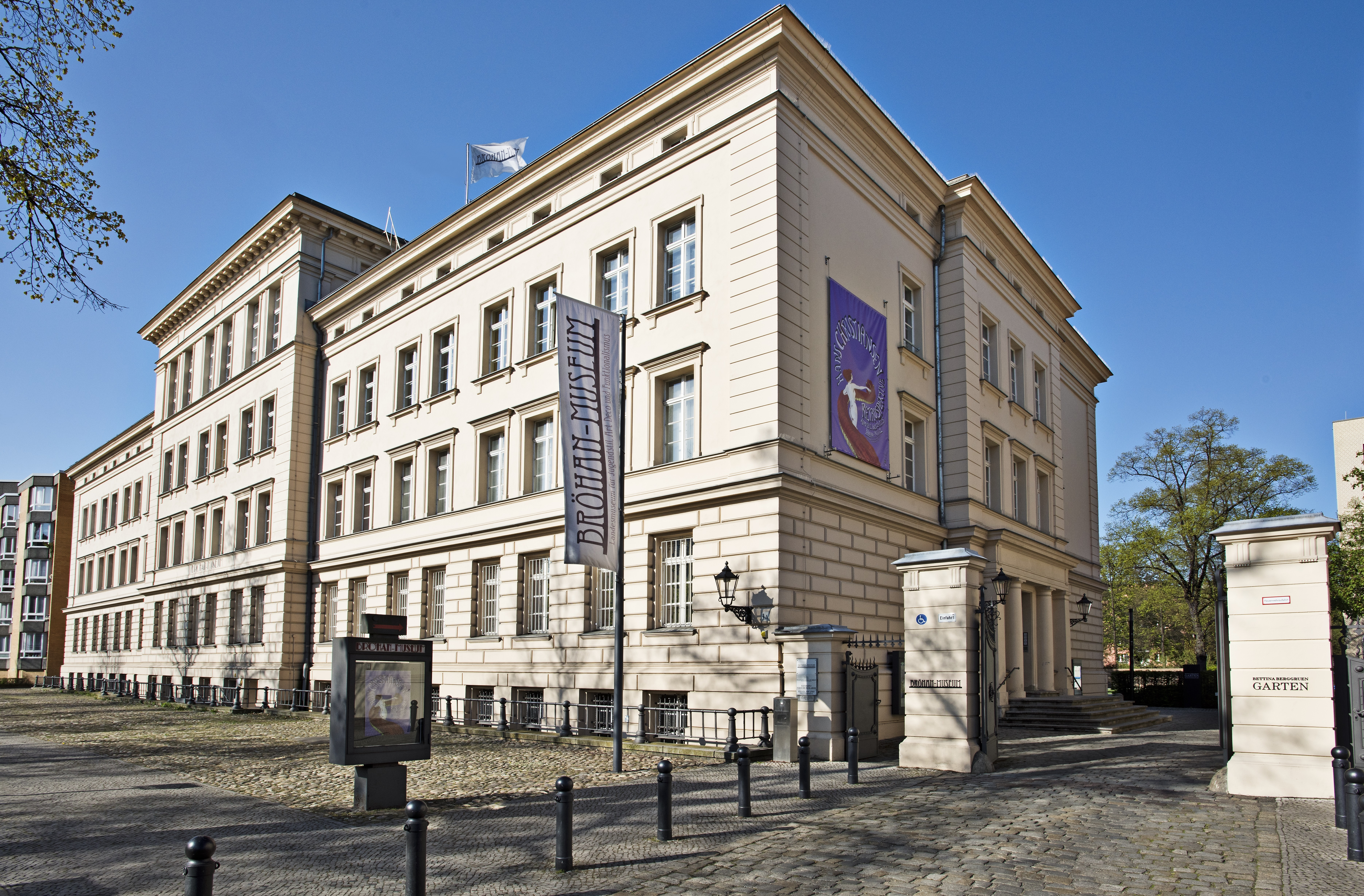
- The Bröhan Museum in 2015
- Established: 1983; 43 years ago (in current building)
- Location: Berlin
- Coordinates: 52°31′07″N 13°17′44″E
- Type: Fine art, architecture and decorative arts (design, furniture)
- Director: Tobias Hoffmann
- Website: broehan-museum.de/en/

The Bröhan Museum is a Berlin state museum for Art Nouveau, Art Deco, and Functionalism, located in Berlin's Charlottenburg district. The museum is named after its founder, entrepreneur and art collector Karl. H. Bröhan (1921–2000), who donated his collection to the state of Berlin on the occasion of his 60th birthday. In 1983, the Bröhan Museum opened in its current space, which belongs to the Charlottenburg Palace ensemble and was originally built for the guard regiment. Since 1994, it has been a state museum.

The museum houses a unique collection of Art Nouveau, Art Deco, and Functionalism as well as works from the Berlin Secession. These areas of focus are complemented by temporary exhibitions of fine art, applied art, and design from 1950 to the present day.

== History ==
The museum's namesake, Karl H. Bröhan, was a qualified salesman and owner of a dental wholesale business. Bröhan began to collect 18th-century porcelain from the Royal Porcelain Manufactory in the early 1960s. Today, these pieces form the basis of the porcelain collection of the Belvedere in the Charlottenburg Palace Park. In the mid-1960s Bröhan's interest as a collector shifted towards Art Nouveau works which had by that point largely been forgotten about: "I realised that in the era around 1900 lay a hardly-known treasure only waiting to be discovered."

From this a steadily growing collection of applied and visual art of Art Nouveau developed, which later included works of Art Deco and Functionalism as well as paintings from the Berlin Secession. In 1973, Bröhan opened a private museum in his Villa in Berlin's Dahlem district, acquired especially for his collection, thereby making the collection accessible to the public for the first time. On his 60th birthday, Bröhan donated his collection to the state of Berlin. On 14 October 1983, the museum moved to its current location at Schloßstraße 1a, a former barracks building that belonged to the ensemble of the Charlottenburg Palace. In 1994 the Bröhan-Museum became a Berlin state museum.

Just like before at its private space, the museum in Charlottenburg was led by Bröhan, who expanded the collection until his death in 2000. For the next 3 years his wife, art historian Margrit Bröhan, directed the museum, followed by art historian Ingeborg Becker.

Since 2013, the director of the Bröhan Museum has been art historian Tobias Hoffmann, who previously led the Museum of Concrete Art in Ingolstadt. The change of management has brought about the modernisation of the museum's programme. Exhibitions like "Do It Yourself Design" (2016), "Kiss: From Rodin to Bob Dylan" (2017) and "Nordic Design: The Response to the Bauhaus" (2019) have linked the historic collection to art and design of the present day.

== Exhibitions ==
The display of the Bröhan Museum's collection constantly changes. Moving away from the concept of a permanent exhibition, objects are regularly swapped and presented in new contexts. In doing so the museum gradually presents its extensive collection to the public.

Furthermore, the museum hosts five to seven major temporary exhibitions as well as smaller shows each year. The diversity of visual and applied arts and design from the 20th century up until the present is shown through various subjects. The objects presented in the temporary exhibitions include not only works from the museum's own collection but national and international loans as well.

For the smaller shows the "Blackbox" format was created in 2016. Under this title exhibitions on poster design, graphics and photography are hosted at regular intervals.

Three floors in the building are at the museum's disposal for exhibition presentations. The floors as well as the individual rooms are regularly redesigned to accommodate new exhibitions.

== Collection ==
Mostly comprising works from between the late 19th century and the beginning of the Second World War, the collection can be divided into the following areas: Art Nouveau, Art Deco, Functionalism, and the Berlin Secession. It includes furniture, porcelain, glassware, ceramics, metalware, light art, and textiles as well as graphic design, painting, and sculpture.

=== Art Nouveau ===
The internationally significant Art Nouveau collection is the heart of the Bröhan Museum. Various national branches of the style are present in the collection, including the English Arts and Crafts movement, the French Art Nouveau, the German and Scandinavian Jugendstil as well as the Vienna Secession. Artists represented in the collection include Hector Guimard, Henry van de Velde, and Peter Behrens.

The porcelain collection of the museum is particularly rich: it encompasses works from important manufacturers in Germany, France and Scandinavia such as the Royal Porcelain Factories of Berlin, Meißen, Nymphenburg and Copenhagen as well as the Manufacture nationale de Sèvres and the Rörstrand und Bing & Grøndahl porcelain factories.

Art Nouveau glass work is represented through the works of Émile Gallé, Daum Frères et Cie and Johann Loetz Witwe.

=== Art Deco ===
Art Deco is represented in the collection of the Bröhan Museum by French furniture ensembles by Jacques-Émile Ruhlmann, the house of Dominique and Süe et Mare, amongst others. Metalwork is shown through wrought iron pieces by Edgar Brandt and silver by Jean Puiforcat and the Tétard Frères. Manifestations of the style in Germany can be seen in ceramics from the Haël-Werkstätte and metalwork from the Reimann-School.

=== Functionalism ===
At the Bröhan Museum, objects with a functionalist design bridge the gap between Art Nouveau and modern industrial design. Leading designers coming from the circles of the Deutscher Werkbund – including Peter Behrens, Richard Riemerschmid, Bruno Paul and Wilhelm Wagenfeld – and working in cooperation with companies such as Café HAG and AEG (Allgemeine Elektricitäts-Gesellschaft) are represented in the collection through furniture, graphic works, ceramics, glass, and metalwork.

The most radical realisation of functionalist design in the Weimar Republic is considered to be the "New Frankfurt" – a housing programme in Frankfurt am Main led by architect Ernst May. Important representatives of the above in the collection of the Bröhan Museum are, for example, Margarete Schütte-Lihotzky with the Frankfurt kitchen or Richard Schadewell with the Frankfurt telephone model for the company H. Fuld & Co.

=== Berlin Secession ===
Another focal point of the Bröhan Museum collection is constituted by the artists of the Berlin Secession. There are especially many works by the painters Hans Baluschek, Karl Hagemeister, Walter Leistikow and Willy Jaeckel. Further Secessionist artists in the collection include Dora Hitz, Käthe Kollwitz, Franz Skarbina and Martin Brandenburg. Thus, the collection retraces the artistic development from Impressionism and Symbolism to Expressionism, the latter being represented by Wilhelm Kohlhoff and Bruno Krauskopf, among others.

== Events and Educational Programme ==
The Bröhan Museum offers an extensive programme tailored to its respective special exhibitions. Presentations, panel discussions, dance performances and concerts are often held in line with the themes of the exhibitions. A special highlight of the programme is the annual summer festival, which is organised in cooperation with the Berggruen Museum and the Rathgen Research Laboratory of the Berlin State Museums.

Comprising a varied programme for children, young people, and adults, education and outreach are an integral part of the Bröhan Museum. Children and their families can discover art and design in the framework of workshops, school holiday programmes, children's birthday parties and the "Family Sundays", a regularly held event of the museum. Furthermore, selected special exhibitions are accompanied by open design workshops. New programmes taking place outside the museum are also developed in order to enable a diverse audience to actively participate in museum-specific subjects. One example of this is the Mobile Future Lab which travelled through various districts of Berlin during 2019 within the framework of the exhibition "Reaching Out for the Future. Fantasies of the Future around 1900". Passers-by were encouraged to participate and their creations were then exhibited in the museum.

== Provenance Research ==
Fulfilling its obligations in accordance with the Washington Declaration, the Bröhan Museum is committed to provenance research with the aim of reconstructing the history of its collection objects and identifying former owners wherever and whenever possible. The museum takes special care and attention to determine whether any of these former owners lost possession of their art due to the persecution by the Nazi or GDR regimes.

== See also ==
- List of design museums

== Publications ==
- „Zu wenig Parfüm, zu viel Pfütze.“ Hans Baluschek zum 150. Geburtstag. Ausstellungskatalog. Bröhan-Museum Berlin. Hrsg. von Tobias Hoffmann, Anna Grosskopf und Fabian Reifferscheidt. Wienand Verlag, Köln 2020, ISBN 978-3-86832-565-2.
- Nordic Design. Die Antwort aufs Bauhaus. Ausstellungskatalog. Bröhan-Museum Berlin. Hrsg. von Tobias Hoffmann, Arnoldsche Verlagsanstalt, Stuttgart 2019, ISBN 978-3-89790-582-5.
- Skandal! Mythos! Moderne! Vereinigung der XI in Berlin. Ausstellungskatalog. Bröhan-Museum Berlin. Hrsg. von Tobias Hoffmann, Anna Grosskopf und Sabine Meister. Wienand Verlag, Köln 2019, ISBN 978-3-86832-523-2.
- Von Arts and Crafts zum Bauhaus. Kunst und Design – eine neue Einheit! Ausstellungskatalog. Bröhan-Museum Berlin. Hrsg. von Tobias Hoffmann. Wienand Verlag, Köln 2019, ISBN 978-3-86832-455-6.
- George Grosz in Berlin. Ausstellungskatalog. Bröhan-Museum Berlin. Hrsg. von Tobias Hoffmann. Kerber Art Verlag, Bielefeld 2018, ISBN 978-3-7356-0520-7.
- Dieter Hacker politisch fotografieren (1974–1981). Ausstellungskatalog. Bröhan-Museum Berlin. Hrsg. von Tobias Hoffmann. Wienand Verlag, Köln 2018, ISBN 978-3-86832-495-2.
- Das französische Grafikerkollektiv Grapus. Ausstellungskatalog. Bröhan-Museum Berlin. Hrsg. von Tobias Hoffmann und Anna Grosskopf. Berlin 2018, ISBN 978-3-941588-13-4.
- Berliner Realismus. Von Käthe Kollwitz bis Otto Dix. Sozialkritik – Satire – Revolution. Ausstellungskatalog. Bröhan-Museum Berlin. Hrsg. von Tobias Hoffmann. Wienand Verlag, Köln 2018, ISBN 978-3-86832-440-2.
- Landschaft zwischen Impressionismus und Expressionismus. Meisterwerke von Hagemeister und Leistikow. Ausstellungskatalog. Bröhan-Museum Berlin. Hrsg. von Tobias Hoffmann. Deutscher Kunstverlag, Berlin 2017, ISBN 978-3-422-07452-1.
- Colori Di Murano (Sammlung Holz, Berlin). Ausstellungskatalog. Bröhan-Museum Berlin. Berlin 2016, ISBN 978-3-00-053386-0.
- Kuss. Von Rodin bis Bob Dylan. Ausstellungskatalog. Bröhan-Museum Berlin. Hrsg. von Tobias Hoffmann und Anna Grosskopf. Wienand Verlag, Köln 2016, ISBN 978-3-86832-375-7.
- Deutschland gegen Frankreich. Der Kampf um den Stil 1900–1930. Ausstellungskatalog. Bröhan-Museum Berlin. Hrsg. von Tobias Hoffmann. Wienand Verlag, Köln 2016, ISBN 978-3-86832-342-9.
- All that Jazz – Plakatkunst von Nikolaus Troxler. Ausstellungskatalog. Bröhan-Museum Berlin. Hrsg. von Tobias Hoffmann. Berlin 2016, ISBN 978-3-941588-11-0.
- Zeitenwende. Von der Berliner Secession zur Novembergruppe. Ausstellungskatalog. Brö
- han-Museum Berlin. Hrsg. von Tobias Hoffmann. Hirmer Verlag, Köln 2015, ISBN 978-3-77742-499-6.
- Schrill, Bizarr, Brachial. Das Neue Deutsche Design der 80er Jahre. Ausstellungskatalog. Bröhan-Museum Berlin. Hrsg. von Tobias Hoffmann und Marcus Zehentbauer. Wienand Verlag, Köln 2014, ISBN 978-3-86832-244-6.
- Kunst und Keksdose. 125 Jahre Bahlsen. Ausstellungskatalog. Bröhan-Museum Berlin. Hrsg. von Tobias Hoffmann. Wienand Verlag, Köln 2014, ISBN 978-3-86832-228-6.
- 1914 – Das Ende der Belle Époque. Ausstellungskatalog. Bröhan-Museum Berlin. Hrsg. von Tobias Hoffmann. Wienand Verlag, Köln 2014, ISBN 978-3-86832-227-9.
- Geschmackssachen. Internationale Esskulturen in Berlin. Ausstellungskatalog. Bröhan-Museum Berlin. Hrsg. von Claudia Zachow und Barbara Schmidt. Gemeinschaftsprojekt der Universität der Künste Berlin und der Weißensee Kunsthochschule Berlin. Berlin 2013, ISBN 978-3-89462-244-2.
- Lust auf Dekor. KPM-Porzellane zwischen Jugendstil und Art Deco. Ausstellungskatalog. Bröhan-Museum Berlin. Hrsg. von Tobias Hoffmann und Claudia Kanowski. Wienand Verlag, Köln 2013, ISBN 978-3-86832-182-1.
- Avantgarde für den Alltag. Jüdische Keramikerinnen in Deutschland 1919–1933. Ausstellungskatalog. Bröhan-Museum Berlin. Hrsg. von Ingeborg Becker und Claudia Kanowski. Berlin 2013, ISBN 978-3-941588-10-3.
- Das Tier im Blick. Der Bildhauer Anton Puchegger (1878–1917). Ausstellungskatalog. Bröhan-Museum Berlin. Hrsg. von Ingeborg Becker. Berlin 2012, ISBN 978-3-941588-09-7.
- 25 Kunststücke aus Jugendstil und Art Deco. 2009/2010 – Zwei Jahre Neuerwerbungen, Schenkungen und ausgewählte Kunstwerke aus der Sammlung des Bröhan-Museum Berlin. Hrsg. von Ingeborg Becker. Berlin 2011, ISBN 978-3-941588-08-0.
- Lauter Einzelheiten. Texte von Vorträgen und früheren Zeitungs- bzw. Magazinveröffentlichungen. Hrsg. von Margrit Bröhan. Bröhan-Museum Berlin, Berlin 2010, ISBN 978-3-941588-07-3.
- Fragile. Glaskunst 1889–1939. Texte zur Ausstellung. Bröhan-Museum Berlin. Hrsg. von Ingeborg Becker und Claudia Kanowski. Berlin 2010, ISBN 978-3-941588-06-6.
- Vom Taunus zum Wannsee. Der Maler Philipp Franck (1860–1944). Ausstellungskatalog. Museum Giersch Frankfurt a. M. und Bröhan-Museum Berlin. Hrsg. von Ingeborg Becker und Manfred Großkinsky. Berlin 2010, ISBN 978-3-941588-05-9.
- Sport und Mode in Italien um 1930. Zeichnungen von Ottorino Mancioli. Ausstellungskatalog. Hrsg. vom Bröhan-Museum Berlin. Berlin 2010, ISBN 978-3-941588-04-2.
- Glaskunst 1889–1939. Bestandskatalog des Bröhan-Museums Berlin. Bd. VII. Hrsg. von Margrit Bröhan und Claudia Kanowski. Berlin 2010 ISBN 978-3-941588-03-5.
- Von Pfauen, Libellen und Fledermäusen. Geheimnisvolle Tierwelt im Jugendstil. Ausstellungskatalog. Hrsg. vom Bröhan-Museum Berlin. Berlin 2009 ISBN 978-3-941588-02-8.
- Bröhan-Museum Berlin. Jugendstil – Art Déco – Funktionalismus. Museumsführer. Hrsg. von Ingeborg Becker. Prestel, München / Berlin / London / New York 2006, ISBN 3-7913-3573-1.
- 30 Jahre Bröhan-Museum Berlin. Kunsthandwerk und Industriedesign. Bildergalerie. Hrsg. vom Bröhan-Museum Berlin. Passage-Verlag, Leipzig 2002, ISBN 3-9807894-2-X.
- Metallkunst der Moderne. Bestandskatalog des Bröhan-Museums Berlin. Bd. VI. Hrsg. vom Bröhan-Museum Berlin, Berlin 2001, ISBN 3-9801525-9-6.
- 25 Jahre Bröhan-Museum Berlin. Kunsthandwerk und Industriedesign. Bildergalerie. Hrsg. vom Bröhan-Museum Berlin. Passage-Verlag, Leipzig 1998, ISBN 3-932900-09-X.
- Porzellan. Kunst und Design 1989–1939. Vom Jugendstil zum Funktionalismus. Teil II: La Maison Moderne – Wien. Bestandskatalog des Bröhan-Museums Berlin. Bd. V/2. Hrsg. vom Bröhan-Museum Berlin, Berlin 1996, ISBN 3-9801525-5-3.
- Porzellan. Kunst und Design 1989–1939. Vom Jugendstil zum Funktionalismus. Teil I: L’Art Nouveau – Kgl. Kopenhagen. Bestandskatalog des Bröhan-Museums Berlin. Bd. V/1. Hrsg. vom Bröhan-Museum Berlin, Berlin 1993, ISBN 3-9801525-4-5.

== Links ==
Commons: Bröhan-Museum – a collection of images, video and audio files

- The website of the Bröhan Museum
- Publications by/about the Bröhan-Museum in the catalogue of the German National Library
- Works of the Bröhan Museum in the German Digital Library
- Works of the Bröhan Museum at the bpk-Bildagentur
- Works of the Bröhan Museum on bildindex.de
- Bröhan Museum on berlin.de
- Bröhan Museum on Museumsportal Berlin
