= Mimi Ferzt Gallery =

Art gallery in SoHo, Manhattan, U.S.

Coordinates: 40.723697°N 74.000786°W

Mimi Ferzt was a contemporary art space in SoHo, Manhattan, New York City. It exhibited Eastern European artists such as Mihail Chemiakin, Nikolai Makarov and Oscar Rabine, as well maintained a roster of Soviet dissident artists who were seeking refuge in the United States. It is permanently closed.

The gallery helped establish the careers and expand the cultural footprint for members of the Soviet non-conformist art movement.
