= Ernst Ludwig Kirchner =

German expressionist painter (1880–1938)

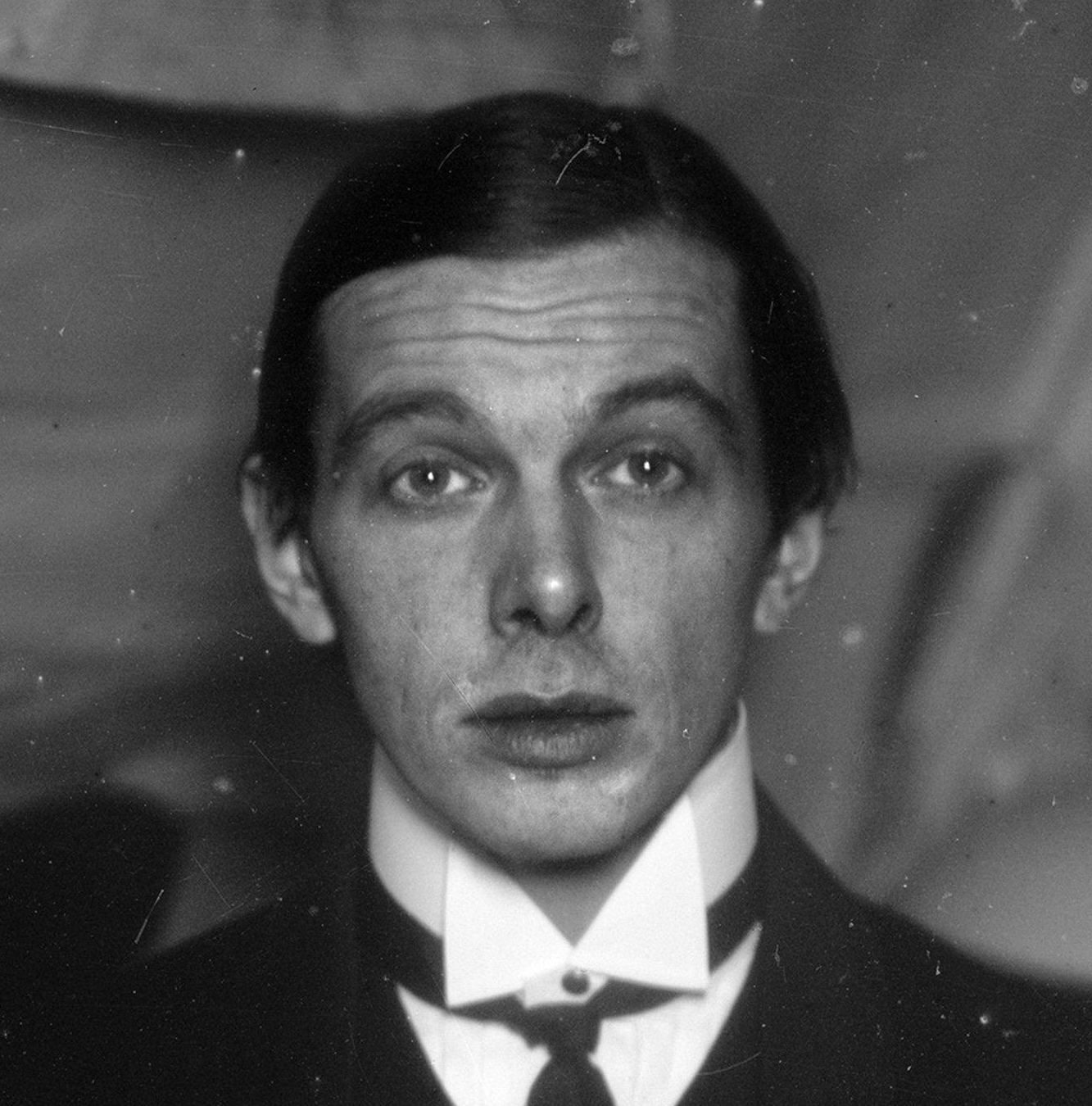
- Photographic self-portrait 1913/1915
- Born: 6 May 1880; Aschaffenburg, Kingdom of Bavaria, German Empire
- Died: 15 June 1938 (aged 58); Frauenkirch-Wildboden, Davos, Switzerland
- Education: Royal Saxon Polytechnicum
- Known for: Painting, printmaking, sculpture
- Notable work: Self-Portrait as a Soldier; Street scenes
- Movement: Expressionism
- Partner(s): Doris Große (1906/1908–1911) ; Erna Schilling (1912–)

Signature
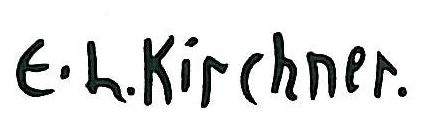

Ernst Ludwig Kirchner (6 May 1880 – 15 June 1938) was a German expressionist painter and printmaker. He was one of the founders of the artists group Die Brücke or "The Bridge", a key group leading to the foundation of Expressionism in 20th-century art. Kirchner volunteered for army service in the First World War, but soon suffered a breakdown and was discharged. His work was branded as "degenerate" by the Nazis in 1937 and more than 600 of his works were sold or destroyed.

== Early life and education ==
Ernst Ludwig Kirchner was born in Aschaffenburg, in Kingdom of Bavaria. His parents were of Prussian descent and his mother Maria Elise née Franke (1851–1928) was a descendant of the Huguenots, a fact to which Kirchner often referred. As Kirchner's father, chemical engineer, design engineer, and inventor in the field of papermaking Ernst Kirchner (1847–1921) searched for a job, the family moved frequently. Kirchner attended schools in Frankfurt and in Perlen near Lucerne, until his father earned the position of Professor of Paper Sciences at the College of Technology in Chemnitz in 1892, where Kirchner attended secondary school.

From 1890, Kirchner attended the Realgymnasium in Chemnitz and made his first attempts at woodcut printing under his father's guidance. He also received private instruction in watercolor painting.

During a school trip to Nuremberg in 1898, young Ernst Ludwig saw the printing blocks for early woodcuts and incunabula at the Germanisches Nationalmuseum and was inspired by the art of Albrecht Dürer to become a painter himself. He later wrote that this experience was decisive in shaping his goal of renewing German art.

== Student in Munich, Dresden ==
Although Kirchner's parents encouraged his artistic career they also wanted him to complete his formal education. In 1901, he began studying architecture at the Royal Saxon Polytechnicum in Dresden (now TU Dresden). The institution provided a wide range of studies in addition to architecture, such as freehand drawing, perspective drawing and the historical study of art. While in attendance, he became close friends with Fritz Bleyl, whom Kirchner met during the first term. They discussed art together and also studied nature, having a radical outlook in common.

Kirchner continued studies at the Polytechnic School of Munich and the Debschitz-Schule, art school run by Wilhelm von Debschitz and Heinrich Obrist, in Munich from 1903 to 1904, returning to Dresden in 1905 to complete his degree with his final diploma examination and turned exclusively to painting.

== Die Brücke, 1905-1913 ==
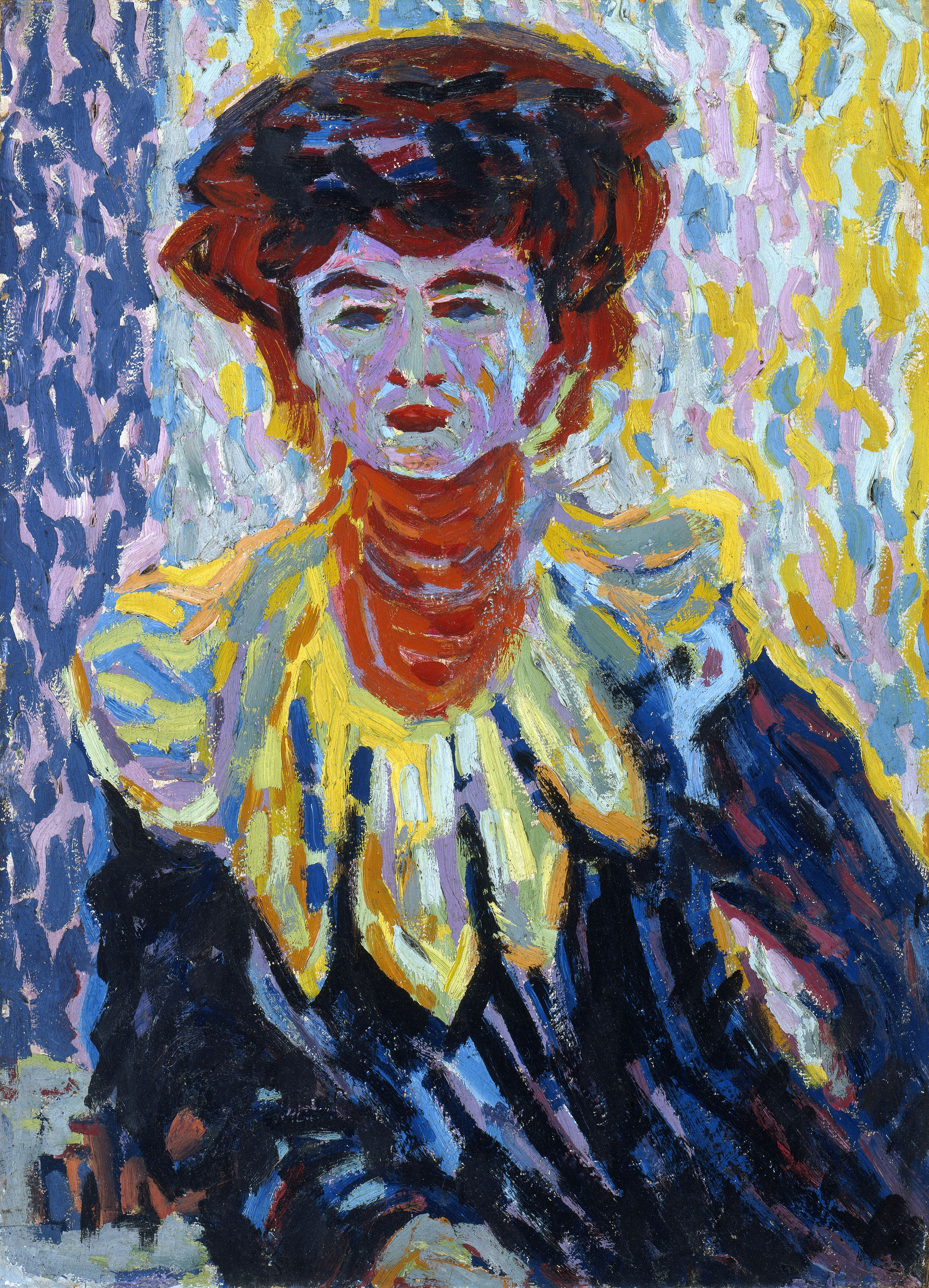
Doris with Ruff Collar, c. 1906, Thyssen-Bornemisza Museum

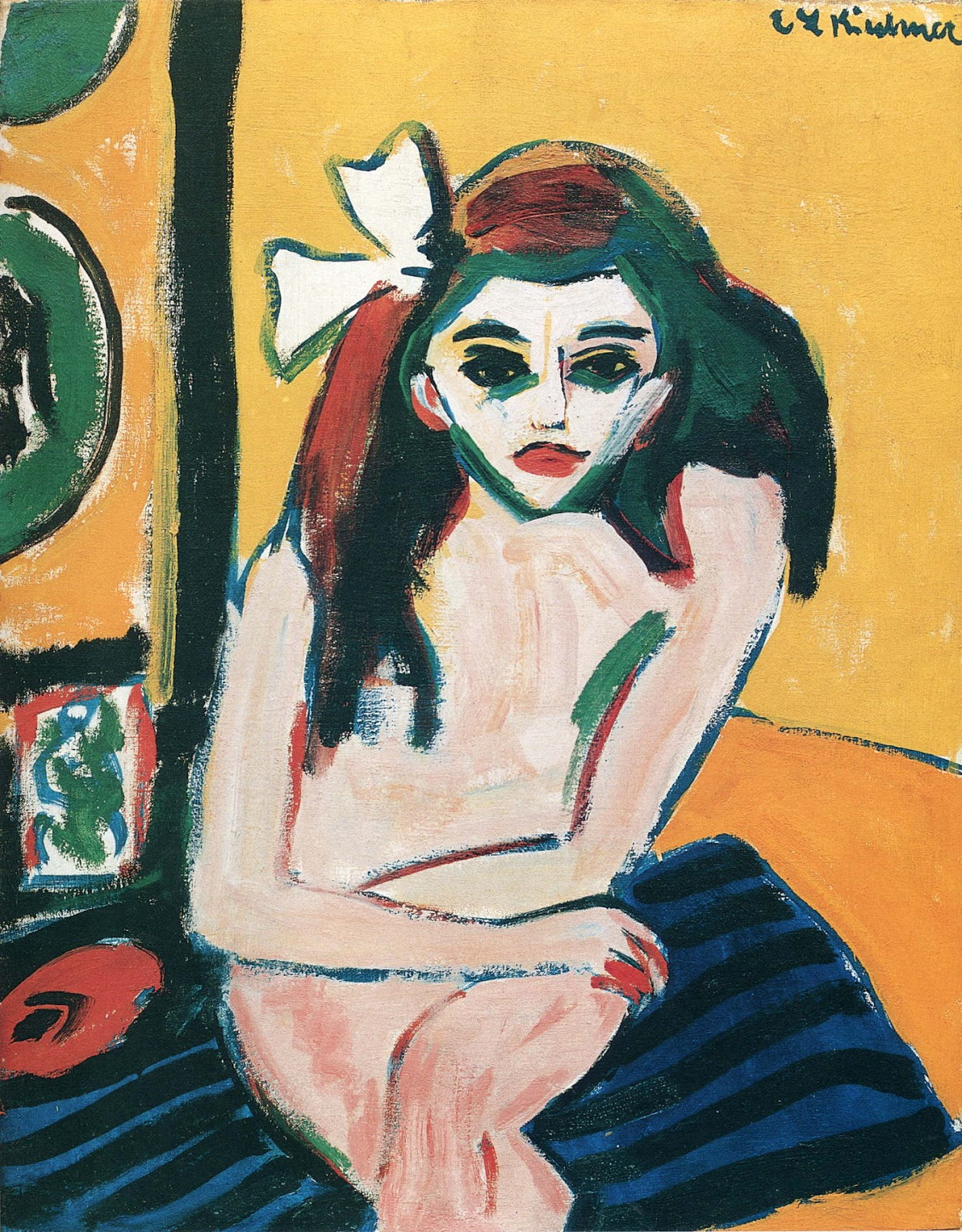
Marzella (1909–10), Moderna Museet, Stockholm

In 1905, Kirchner, along with Fritz Bleyl and two other architecture students, Karl Schmidt-Rottluff and Erich Heckel, founded the artists group Die Brücke ("The Bridge"). From then on, he committed himself to art. The group aimed to eschew the prevalent traditional academic style and find a new mode of artistic expression, which would form a bridge (hence the name) between the past and the present. They responded both to past artists such as Albrecht Dürer, Matthias Grünewald and Lucas Cranach the Elder, as well as contemporary international avant-garde movements. As part of the affirmation of their national heritage, they revived older media, particularly woodcut prints.

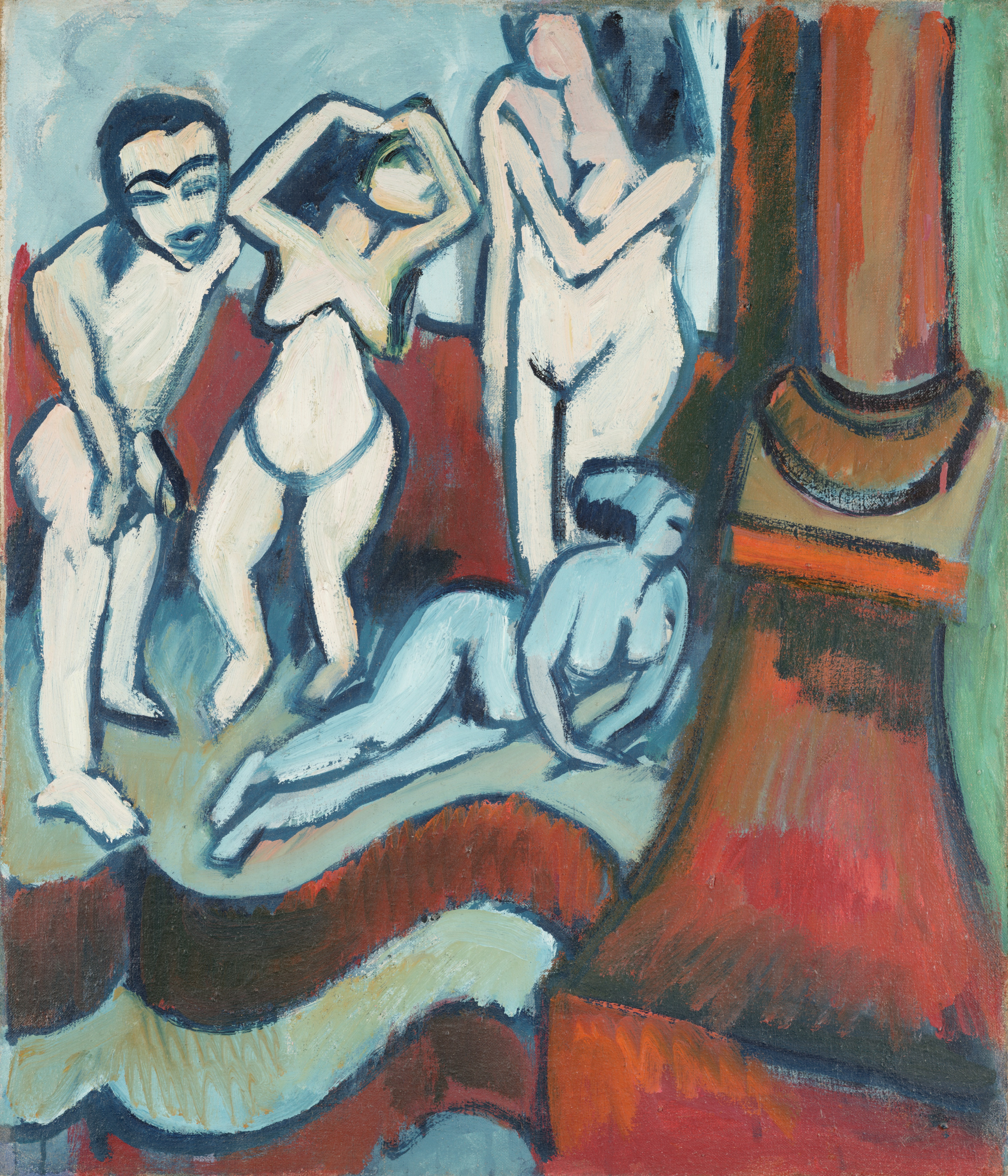
Vier Holzplastiken, 1912, Dallas Museum of Art

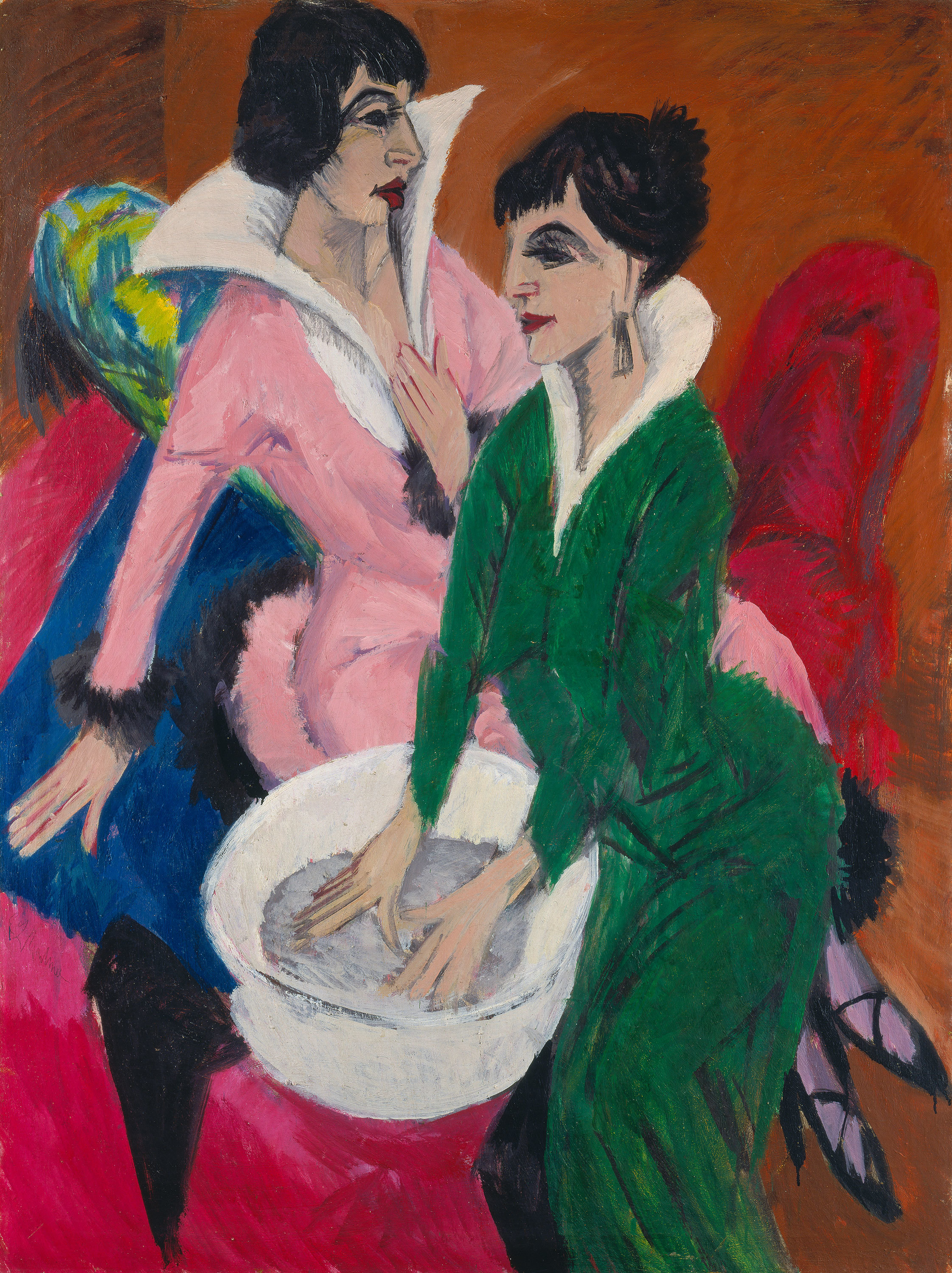
Two Women with a Washbasin (The Sisters), 1913, Städel Museum

Their group had a major impact on the evolution of modern art in the 20th century and created the style of Expressionism. The group met initially in Kirchner's first studio, which had previously been a butcher's shop. Bleyl described it as "that of a real bohemian, full of paintings lying all over the place, drawings, books and artist's materials — much more like an artist's romantic lodgings than the home of a well-organised architecture student".

Kirchner's studio became a venue which overthrew social conventions to allow casual love-making and frequent nudity. Group life-drawing sessions took place using models from the social circle, rather than professionals, and choosing quarter-hour poses to encourage spontaneity. Bleyl described one such model, Isabella, a fifteen-year-old girl from the neighbourhood, as "a very lively, beautifully built, joyous individual, without any deformation caused by the silly fashion of the corset and completely suitable to our artistic demands, especially in the blossoming condition of her girlish buds."

A group manifesto written by Kirchner in 1906 stated that "Everyone who reproduces, directly and without illusion, whatever he senses the urge to create, belongs to us". In September and October 1906, the first group exhibition was held, focused on the female nude, in the showroom of K.F.M. Seifert and Co. in Dresden.

In 1906, he met milliner Doris Große, who was his favoured model until 1911. Between 1907 and 1911, he stayed during the summer at the Moritzburg lakes and on the island of Fehmarn (which he revisited until 1914) with other Brücke members; his work featured the female nude in natural settings. In 1911, he moved to Berlin, where he founded a private art school, MIUM-Institut, in collaboration with Max Pechstein with the aim of promulgating "Moderner Unterricht im Malen" (modern teaching of painting). This was not a success and closed the following year, when he also began a relationship with dancer Erna Schilling that lasted the rest of his life.

In 1913, his writing of Chronik der Brücke (Brücke chronicle) led to the ending of the group. At this time, he established an individual identity with his first solo exhibition, which took place at the Essen Folkwang Museum. During the next two years, he painted a series of "Straßenszenen" (street scenes) showing the streets of Berlin, with the central characters of street walkers.

== Military service and mental breakdown, 1914-1916 ==
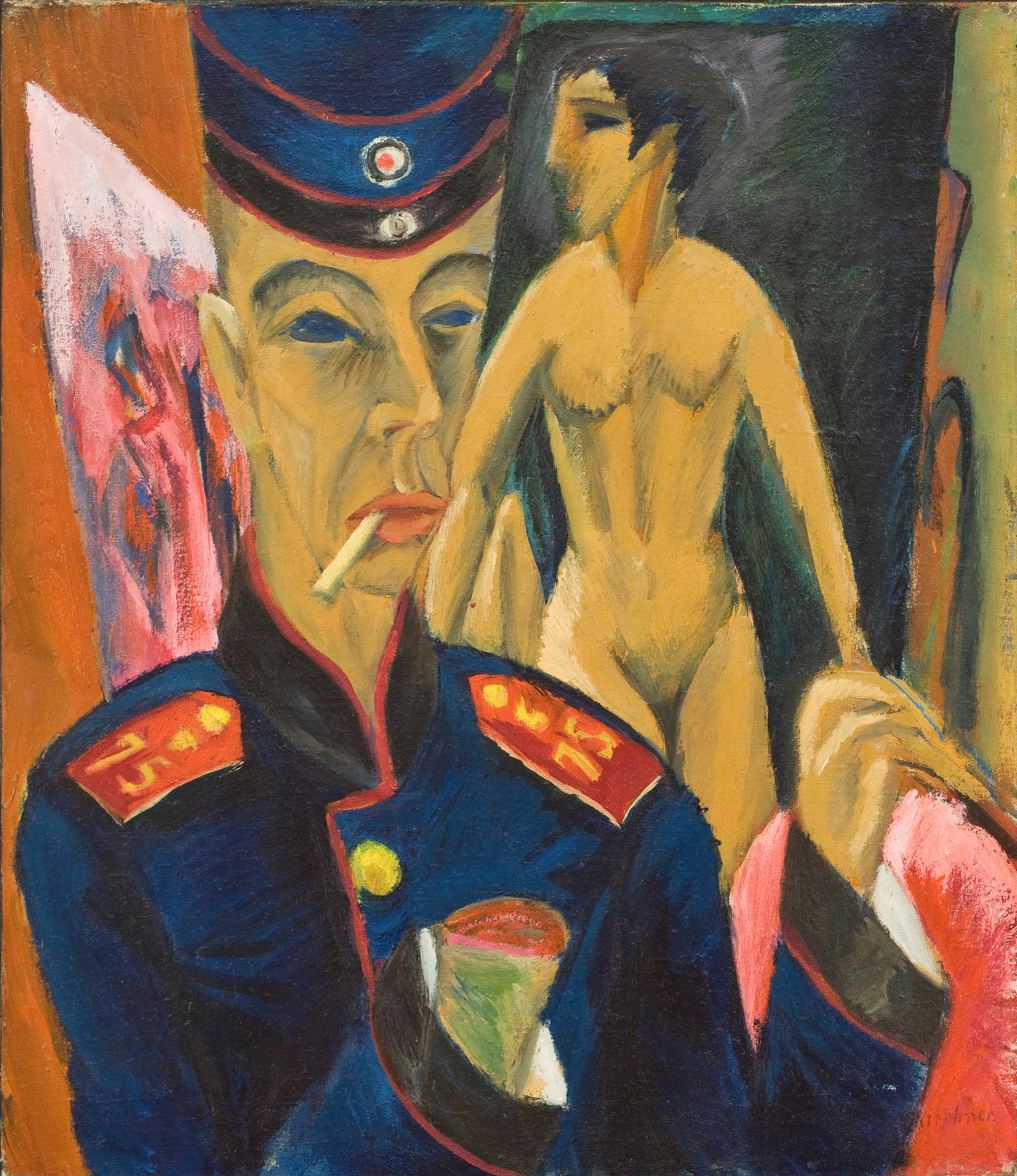
Self-Portrait as a Soldier (1915), Allen Memorial Art Museum in Oberlin, Ohio

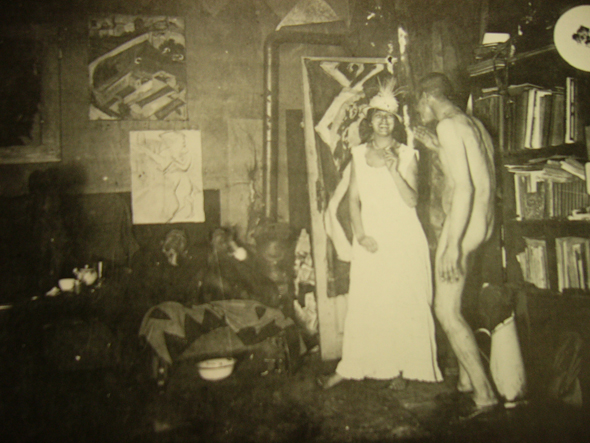
Kirchner's Berlin studio in 1915

At the onset of the First World War in September 1914, Kirchner volunteered for military service at the age of 35. In July 1915 he was sent to Halle an der Saale to train as a driver in the reserve unit of the 75th Mansfeld Field Artillery Regiment. Kirchner's riding instructor, Professor Hans Fehr, arranged for Kirchner to be discharged after a mental breakdown. Kirchner then returned to Berlin and continued to work, producing many paintings including Self-Portrait as a Soldier (1915). In December 1915 he was admitted to Dr. Oskar Kohnstamm's sanatorium in Königstein (Taunus), where he was diagnosed with alcoholism and addiction to Veronal.

In a letter to Dr. Karl Hagemann, a friend and patron, Kirchner wrote: "After lengthy struggles I now find myself here for a time to put my mind into some kind of order. It is a terribly difficult thing, of course, to be among strangers so much of the day. But perhaps I'll be able to see and create something new. For the time being, I would like more peace and absolute seclusion. Of course, I long more and more for my work and my studio. Theories may be all very well for keeping a spiritual balance, but they are grey and shadowy compared with work and life".

Throughout 1916, Kirchner periodically returned to Berlin for a few weeks at a time to continue his work at his studio; he also produced a series of oil paintings, and many drawings, during his stays in Königstein. After an exhibition of his work at the gallery of Ludwig Schames, in Frankfurt am Main, in October 1916, Kirchner sold many works and began to do well financially. In December, he suffered from a nervous breakdown and was admitted to Dr. Edel's sanatorium in Berlin-Charlottenburg.

== Davos, 1917-1938 ==
In 1917, at the suggestion of Eberhard Grisebach, Helene Spengler invited Kirchner to Davos. He arrived on 19 January 1917. There he visited an exhibition of Ferdinand Hodler's paintings. His visit to Davos coincided with a spell of exceptionally cold weather, and he returned to Berlin after only ten days.

Grisebach visited him in March 1917, writing to Helene Spengler of Kirchner's condition: "I spent two mornings with Kirchner which I shall never forget. I found him sitting on a very low chair next to a small, hot stove in a yellow-painted, sloping-roofed attic. Only with the help of a stick was he able to walk, staggering around the room. ... A colourfully painted curtain concealed a large collection of paintings. When we began to look at them, he came alive. Together with me, he saw all his experiences drift by on canvas, the small, timid-looking woman set aside what we had seen and brought a bottle of wine. He made short explanatory remarks in a weary voice. Each picture had its own particular colourful character, a great sadness was present in all of them; what I had previously found to be incomprehensible and unfinished now created the same delicate and sensitive impression as his personality. Everywhere a search for style, for psychological understanding of his figures. The most moving was a self- portrait in uniform with his right hand cut off. Then he showed me his travel permit for Switzerland. He wanted to go back to Davos... and implored me to ask father for a medical certificate. ... As the woman with him rightly said, though many people want to help him, nobody is able to do so any longer. ... When I was leaving, I thought of Van Gogh's fate and thought that it would be his as well, sooner or later. Only later will people understand and see how much he has contributed to painting".

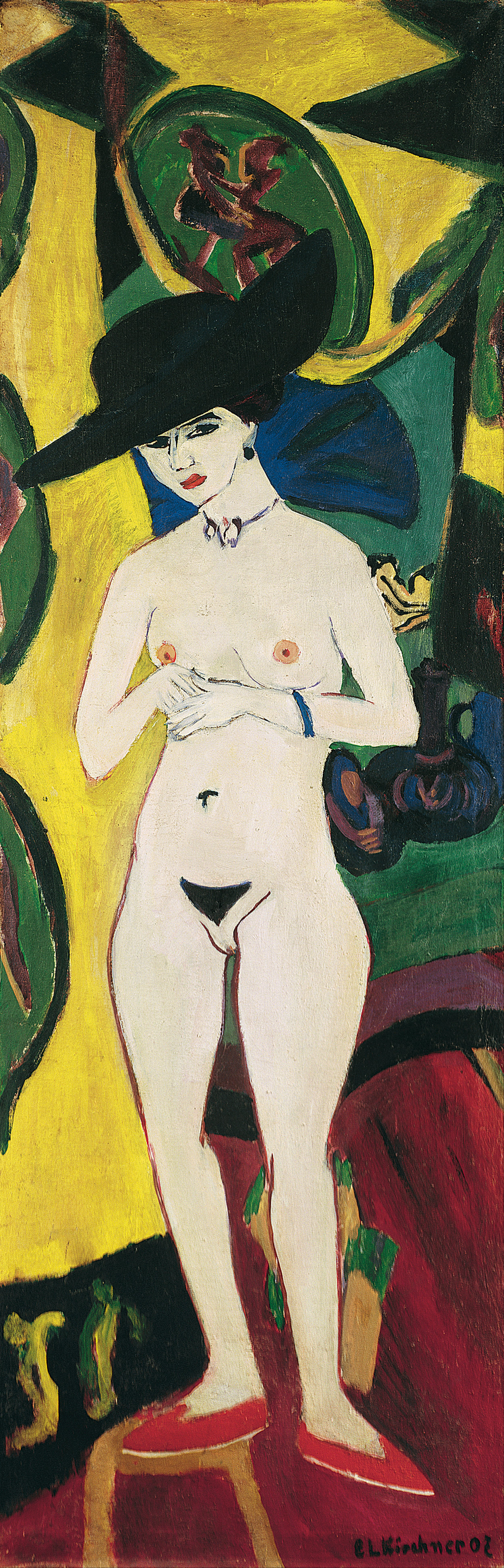
Standing Nude with Hat, 1910, Städel Museum in Frankfurt am Main

In April 1917, Kirchner's close friend and mentor Botho Graef died. Kirchner decided to return to Davos for treatment. There he was under the care of lung-specialist Dr. Lucius Spengler, who forced Kirchner to adhere to strict rules and routine. Kirchner deeply resented this and did everything in his power to deceive the doctor: "Spengler didn't know what to do with me, for my deception was totally alien to this excellent man's way of thinking". To avoid being under constant watch, Kirchner moved to the Reusch Hut on the Stafelalp in the summer of 1917. All this time, Erna Schilling had stayed in Berlin, looking after the apartment and studio and making sure that commercial and personal contacts in Germany were not neglected. Towards the end of August, Kirchner had a further visit from Henry van de Velde.

Kirchner continued to experience depression, occasional pain and paralysis of his limbs but wrote in a more cheerful tone to Dr. Hagemann at the end of July: "I wish to remain in the world and for the world. The high mountains here will help me". The summer 1917 was very productive despite Kirchner's illness. He finished some important pieces during the two months, such as "View of the Church in Monstein" and "Rising Moon in the Stafelalp". Together with 11 woodcuts, these works marked the start of Kirchner's Alpine life.

Kirchner was admitted to The Bellevue Sanatorium, run by Ludwig Binswanger, in Kreuzlingen through the good office of Henry van de Velde, where he continued to produce paintings and woodcuts. In 1918, Kirchner was given a residence permit and he moved to "In den Lärchen" farm, above Längmatte in Davos, where he rented a room of the upper hut on the first floor and eventually the above rooms in 1919, which he decorated with furniture that he carved. He wrote of the house to Henry van de Velde: "I'm living in a beautiful old Grisons house with a kitchen that looks like Rembrandt's studio". Kirchner overcame his illness and, although he was still dependent on morphine, his doctor was slowly decreasing his doses. He also wrote "A Painter's Credo" where he states: "There is an intellectual guardianship over the world, it is man.... This is the last judgement, before them you stand..... They help you when you work. You can thank them only through work. When you want to die, they sometimes appear to you. When you are completely empty and completely open, you belong to them". Erna Schilling, his life partner, visited him periodically in Frauenkirch, while also maintaining a residence in Berlin to take care of Kirchner's business there.

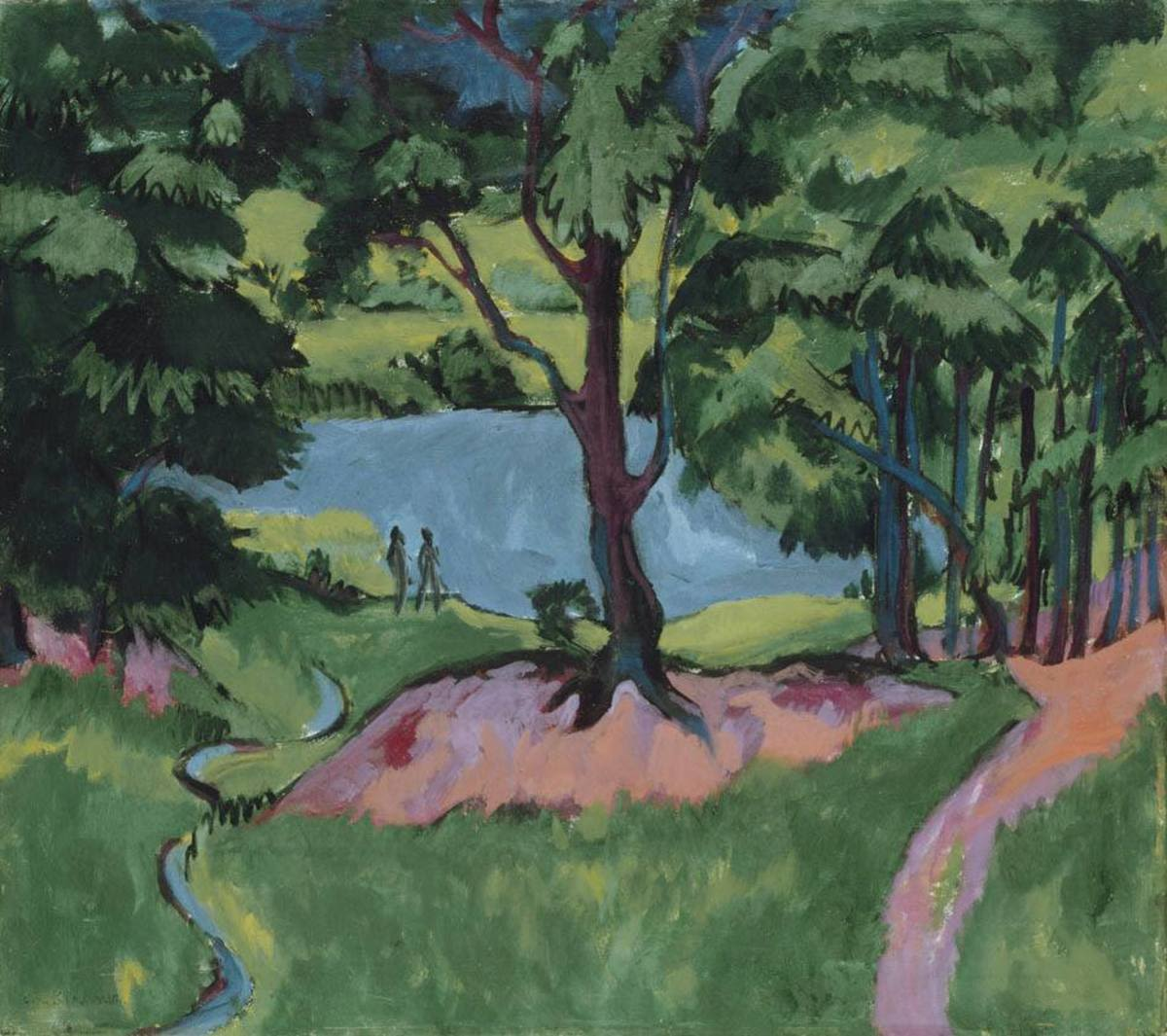
Böhmischer Waldsee (Bohemian Forest Lake), 1911, Pinakothek der Moderne in Munich

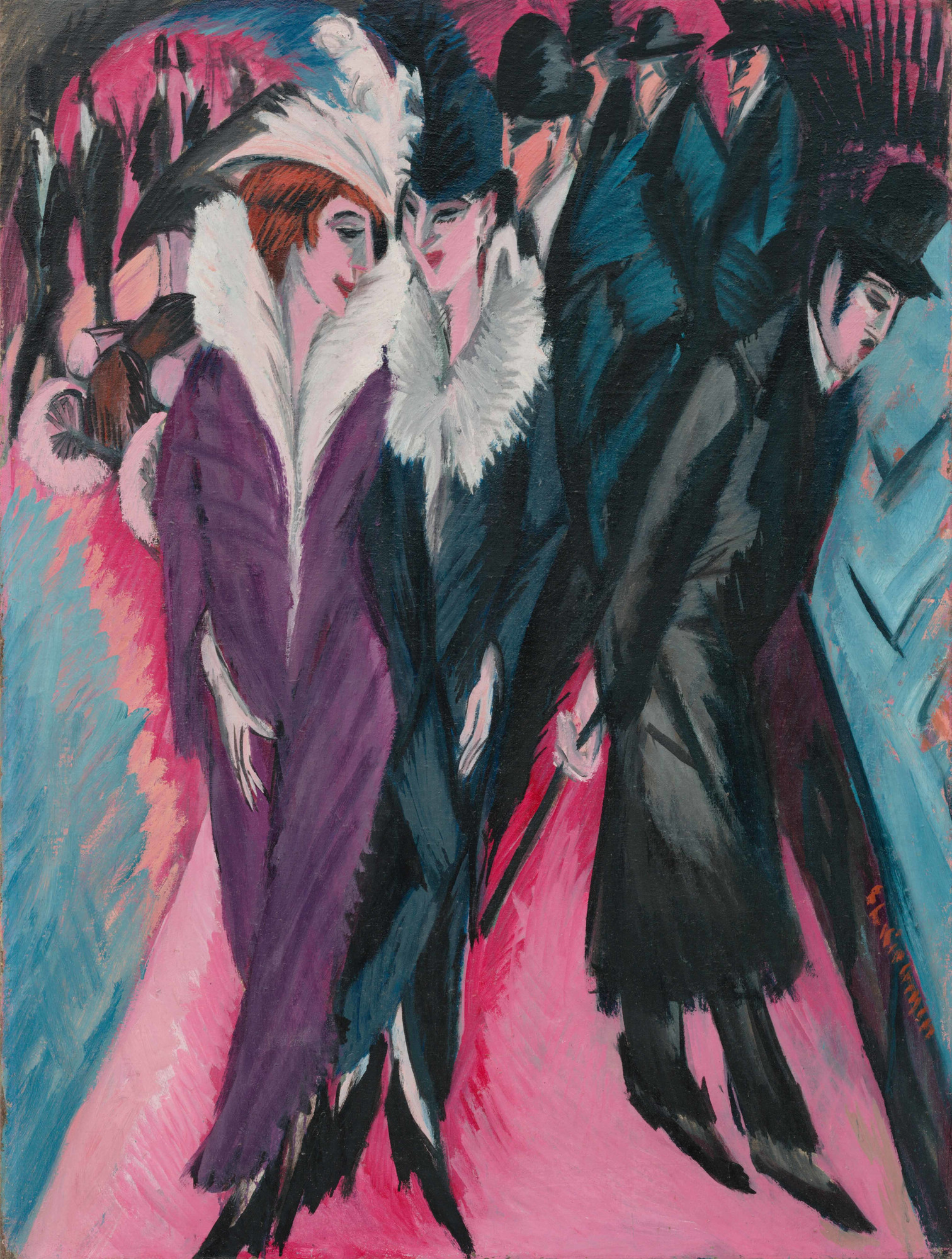
Street, Berlin (1913), one of a series on this theme, depicting prostitutes, Museum of Modern Art

Kirchner continued to work through 1919 and 1920 as his health also rapidly improved. His reputation grew with several exhibitions in Germany and Switzerland in 1920. He was provided with many subjects to paint as he came to know the farmers of the area, who were amazed by Kirchner's gramophone. Kirchner wrote of the people of Davos: "The people who live here are proud. The hard work, which is done with great love, the way they treat animals (you very seldom see an animal being mishandled) entitle them to be proud. In most cases, work here has reached the ideal standard of being done with love. You can see it in the movements of their hands. And that, in turn, ennobles the facial expression and imbues all personal contacts with a great delicacy. This is a country in which democracy has become reality. Here a man's word still counts, and you need have no fears about sleeping with your doors open. I am so happy to be allowed to be here, and through hard work I should like to thank the people for the kindness they have shown me". Kirchner began writing critiques of his own art under the pseudonym of Louis de Marsalle in order to control public opinion of him and free himself of dependence upon the art critics of the day.

In 1921, there was a major display of Kirchner's work in Berlin and the reviews were favourable. Kirchner's father died on 14 February. Kirchner visited Zurich at the beginning of May and met the Nina Hard, whom he invited back to Frauenkirch despite Erna's objections. Dancer Nina Hard would become an important model for Kirchner and would be featured in many of his works. Kirchner began creating designs for carpets which were then woven by weaver Lise Gujer.

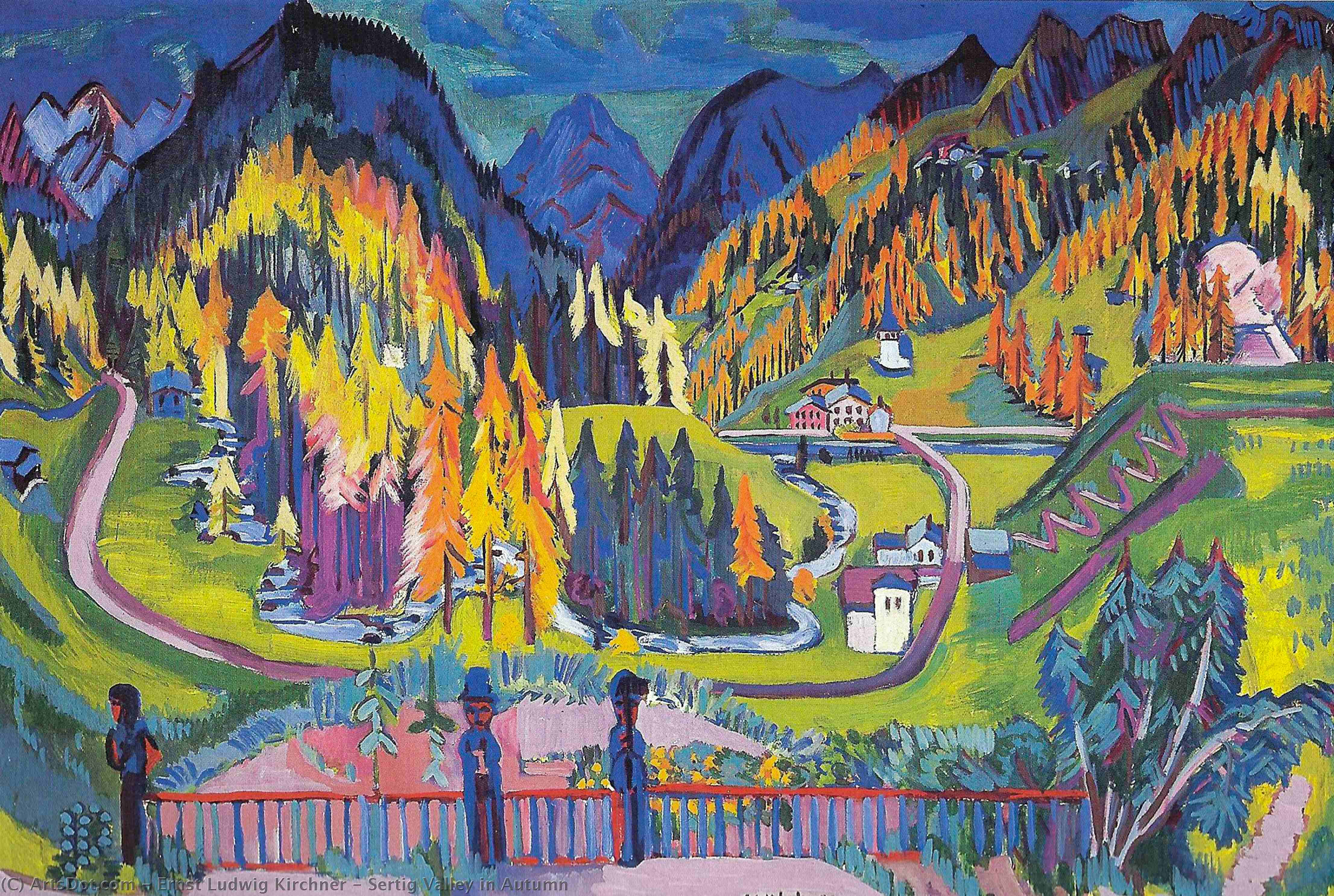
Sertig Valley in Autumn, 1925, Kirchner Museum Davos

In 1923, Kirchner moved to the Wildboden house, writing in his diary: "Our new little house is a real joy to us. We shall live here comfortably and in great new order. This will really come to be a turning point of my life. Everything must be put in clear order and the little house furnished as simply and modestly as possible, while still being beautiful and intimate". The house looked over Frauenkirch and the Stafelalp on one side and on the other, Davos and Kirchner used these landscapes as subjects for many of his paintings.

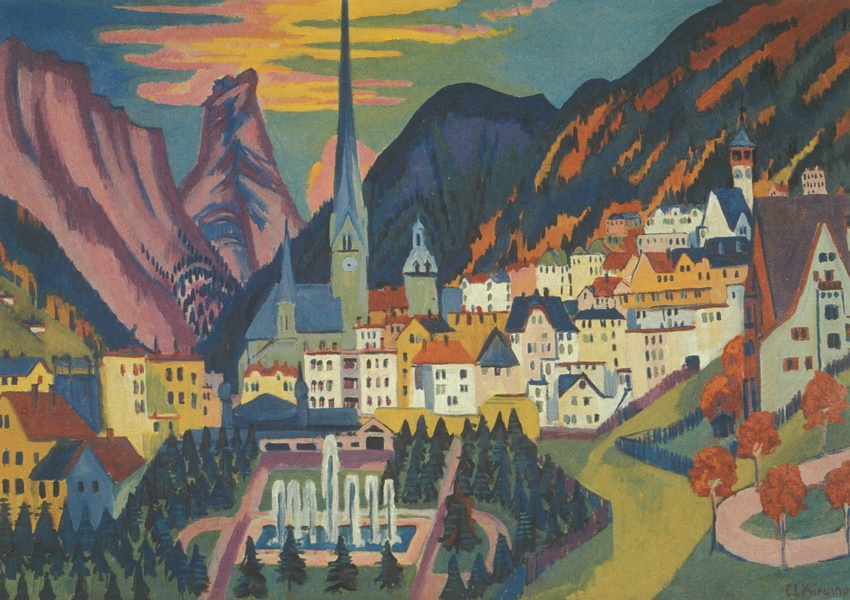
Davos in Summer, 1925, Kirchner Museum Davos in Davos

In 1925, Kirchner became close friends with fellow artist, Albert Müller and his family. Rot-Blau, ('Red-Blue') a new art group based in Basel, was formed by Hermann Scherer, Albert Müller, Paul Camenisch and Hans Schiess, who all visited Kirchner and worked under his guidance. At the end of 1925, Kirchner returned to Germany and made his rounds to Frankfurt, Chemnitz, where his mother was living, and Berlin where he met with Karl Schmidt-Rottluff who wanted Kirchner to form a new artist's group, but Kirchner politely refused. He then returned to Frauenkirch and wrote to Dr. Hageman on 26 March 1926: "Now I'm sitting quietly at home again and I'm happy to be able to work undisturbed. I made a lot of sketches of life in Germany and it was very intriguing to see life there. I was also glad to see the old pictures of Rembrandt, Dürer, etc. again and to have the confirmation and encouragement they gave me. As for the moderns, I saw damned little that gripped me". In December 1926, Kirchner's close friend, Albert Müller, died of typhoid fever along with his wife, Anni Müller. In 1927, Kirchner organized a memorial exhibition for Albert Müller at the Kunsthalle Basel. There was a major exhibition of Kirchner's work at the schoolhouse in Davos with positive reviews.

Kirchner continued to work in Frauenkirch, his style growing increasingly abstract. In 1929, Kirchner was forced to distance himself from Rot-Blau after they pledged allegiance to him, which upset Kirchner greatly. He addressed them in "An open letter to the Basel Red-Blue group" in No. 5 of Das Kunstblatt, where stated that he was not their patron. In the same year, Kirchner visited Zurich, Berlin, and Essen. He was also visited in Frauenkirch by the painter Fritz Winter.

In 1930, Kirchner began to experience health problems due to smoking and in 1931 Erna had to undergo surgery in Berlin due to a suspected growth. In 1931, he was made a member of the Prussian Academy of Arts in Berlin. As the Nazi party took power in Germany in 1933, it became impossible for Kirchner to sell his paintings.

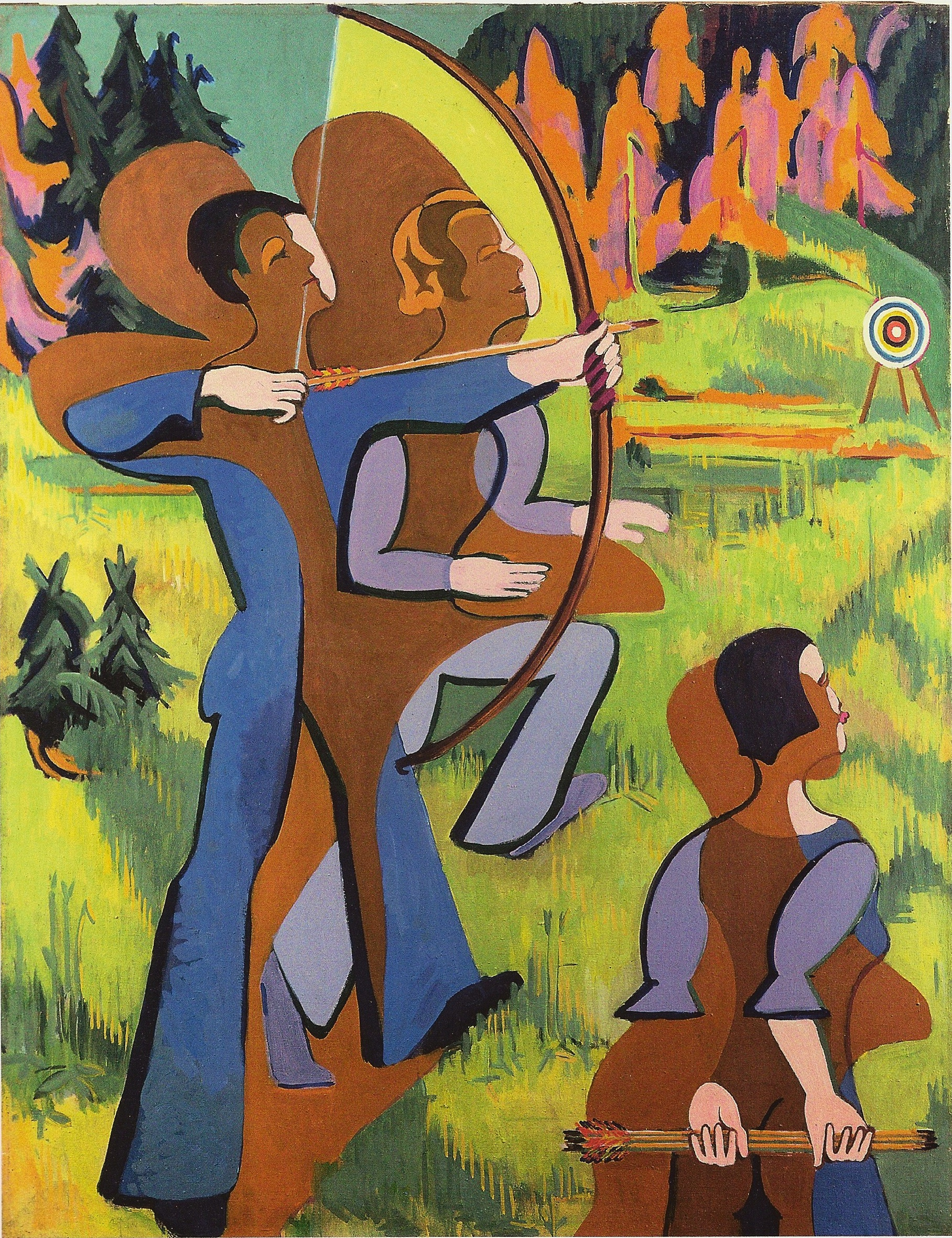
Archers, 1935–1937, Kirchner Museum Davos in Davos

In 1934, Kirchner visited Bern and Zurich, finding the former more pleasing than the latter, and met Paul Klee. In the winter of 1935, a new school was being planned to be built in Frauenkirch. Kirchner offered to paint a mural, but the project was dropped and Kirchner created a sculpture to be placed above the door of the schoolhouse instead. Reflecting on the inauguration of the schoolhouse in 1936 he writes, "the new school was inaugurated yesterday. It was a celebration with songs, dancing and speeches, followed by drinking such as I have not seen or experienced in decades...They made a point of including me and so there I was, sitting once again amongst these people who had received me with such kindness and friendliness on the alp twenty years ago. The relief has found favour and was mentioned often in the speeches".

Throughout 1936 and 1937, Kirchner began to experience health problems and was prescribed Ovaltine and Eukodal by his doctors. In 1937, he was forced to resign from the Prussian Academy of Arts. Kirchner became increasingly disturbed by the situation in Germany, writing: "Here we have been hearing terrible rumours about torture of the Jews, but it's all surely untrue. I'm a little tired and sad about the situation up there. There is a war in the air. In the museums, the hard-won cultural achievements of the last 20 years are being destroyed, and yet the reason why we founded the Brücke was to encourage truly German art, made in Germany. And now it is supposed to be un-German. Dear God. It does upset me". The same year, the Degenerate Art Exhibition included 25 of his 639 works removed from museums. The Prussian Academy of Arts in Berlin expelled Kirchner as a member. Kirchner continued to work and organised a major exhibit in Basel, which received mixed reviews.

== Death ==
Throughout 1938, Kirchner became increasingly upset with the situation in Germany. After Austria was annexed by Germany in the Anschluss, Kirchner became disturbed by the idea that Germany might invade Switzerland. On 15 June 1938, Kirchner took his own life by gunshot in front of his home in Frauenkirch; however, there are doubts about his death being a suicide. Three days later, Kirchner was laid to rest in the Waldfriedhof cemetery. Erna continued to live in the house until her death in 1945.

== Legacy ==
In 1913, the first public showing in the United States of Kirchner's work took place at the Armory Show, which was also the first major display of modern art in America. In 1921, U.S. museums began to acquire his work and did so increasingly thereafter. His first solo museum show in the US was at the Detroit Institute of Arts in 1937. In 1969, a major retrospective of paintings, drawings, and prints traveled to the Seattle Art Museum, the Pasadena Art Museum, and the Museum of Fine Arts, Boston. In 1992, the National Gallery of Art, Washington, held a monographic show, Ernst Ludwig Kirchner: Paintings, Drawings, and Prints, using its existing collection and private collection loans. A major international loan exhibition Ernst Ludwig Kirchner took place in 2003 and was organized by the National Gallery of Art (exhibited 2 March–1 June 2003) and the Royal Academy of Arts, London (exhibited 20 June–21 September 2003).

In November 2006 at Christie's, Kirchner's Street Scene, Berlin (1913) fetched $38 million, a record for the artist. To celebrate the Neue Galerie's partial acquisition of Berlin Street Scene it exhibited Ernst Ludwig Kirchner: Berlin Street Scene from 26 July–17 September 2007, along with other works from its collection.

From 3 August to 10 November 2008, the Museum of Modern Art in New York held a major exhibition Kirchner and the Berlin Street that "probably comprises the very best of his oeuvre."

From 9 December 2015–10 April 2016, Singer Laren museum in the Netherlands mounted the "Kirchner: Paradise in the Mountains," an exhibition that examined his time in a sanitorium in Davos.

From 16 November 2018–3 March 2019 the Bundeskunsthalle, Bonn, exhibited Ernst Ludwig Kirchner's Imaginary Travels, organized by the Art Centre Basel.

From 15 December 2018–31 March 2019, the Brücke-Museum exhibited Ernst Ludwig Kirchner The Swiss Years: Masterpieces from the Collection of E. W. Kornfeld.

From 3 October 2019–13 January 2020, the Neue Galerie, New York, exhibited Ernst Ludwig Kirchner, an exhibit that focused on his use of color.

From 4 September–5 December 2021, the Stedelijk Museum Amsterdam exhibited Kirchner and Nolde: Expressionism Colonialism.

In 2024, the Yale University Art Gallery hosted Munch and Kirchner: Anxiety and Expression which examined the prints of both artists and "…how these artists suffered from—and attempted to cope with—the anxieties of their age."

From 15 June 2025–7 September 2025, the Kirchner Museum Davos exhibited Ernst Ludwig Kirchner. Between Painting and Photography.

Many of Kirchner's collectors were Jewish and persecuted by the Nazis for that reason. They either sold off their collections in order to flee the Nazis or had their collections seized. The Kirchner paintings "Berlin Street Scene" and "Judgement of Paris" were owned by the Jewish art collector Alfred Hess whose widow was forced to relinquish them before fleeing. Kirchner's 1915 painting Artillerymen was owned by the important art dealer of modern art, the German Jewish Alfred Flechtheim whose art gallery was Aryanized (seized by Nazis) in 1933 before he fled Germany. Kirchner's painting Sand Hills in Engadine, which had been seized by the Nazis in 1935 after its owner, Max Fischer, fled Germany for the United States, found its way into the collection of the MoMA, but was returned to Fischer's heirs in 2015.

== Gallery ==
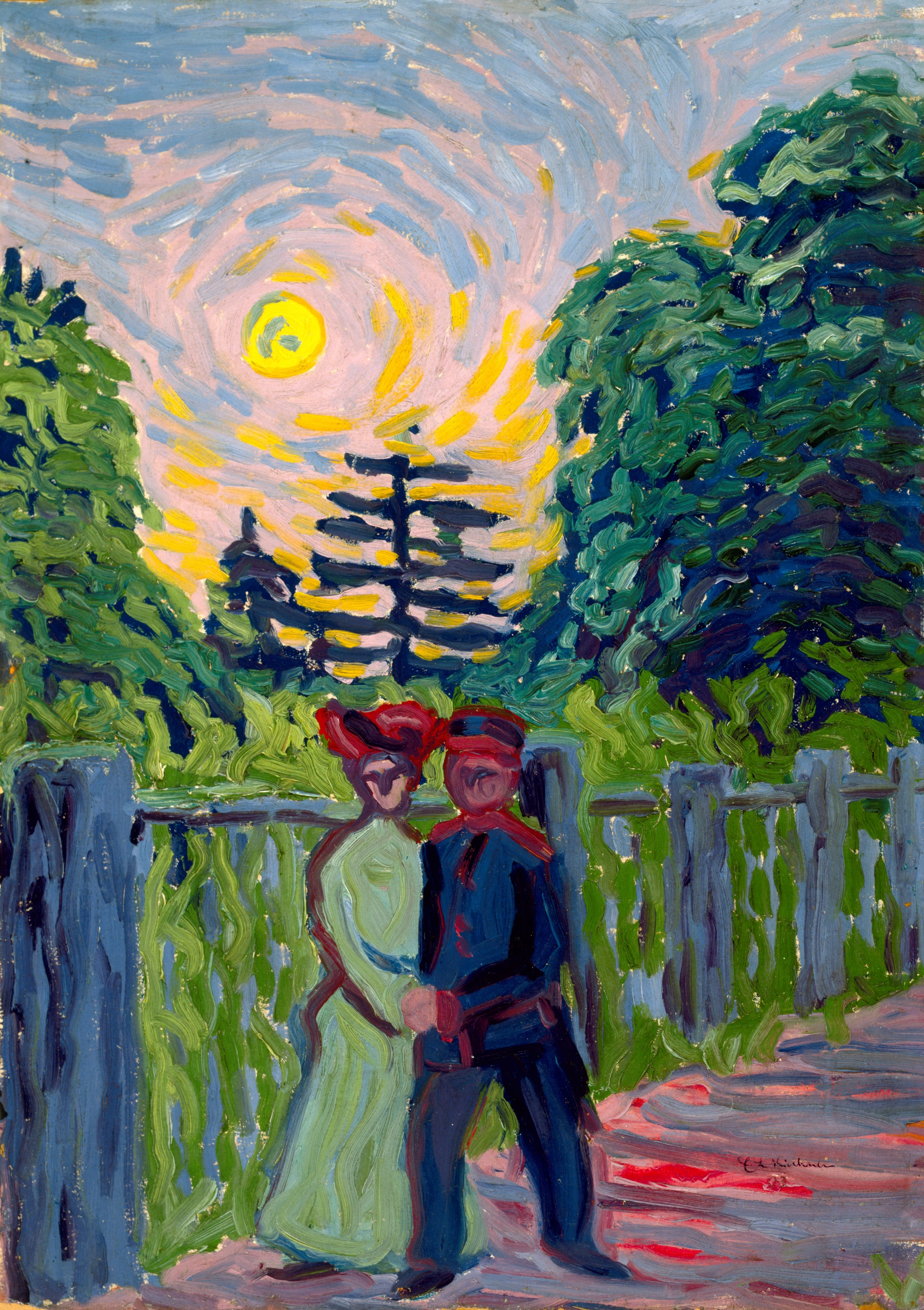
Moonrise, Soldier and Maiden, 1905, Museum of Fine Arts, Houston

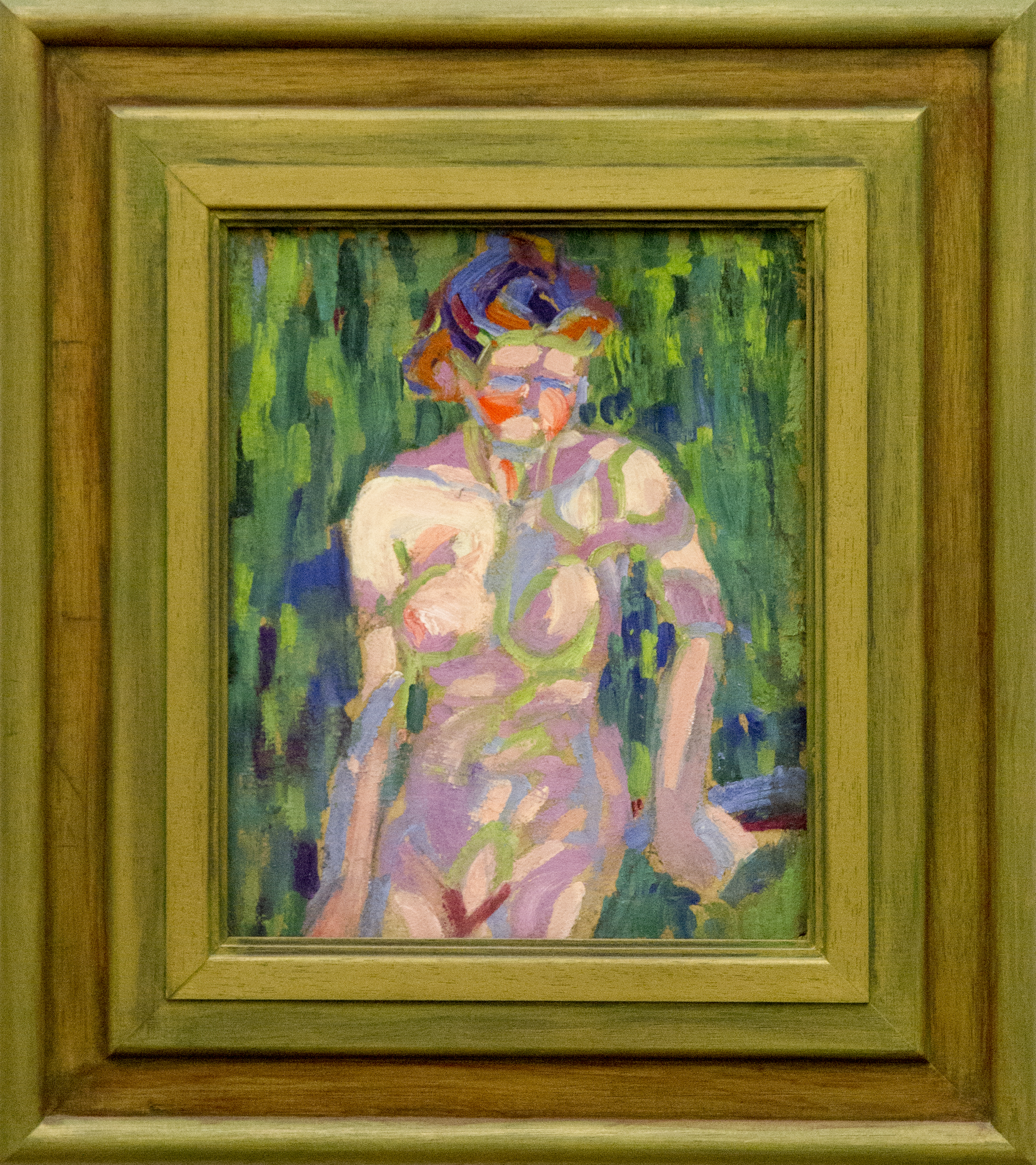
Female Nude with Foliage Shadows, 1905, Kirchner Museum Davos in Davos

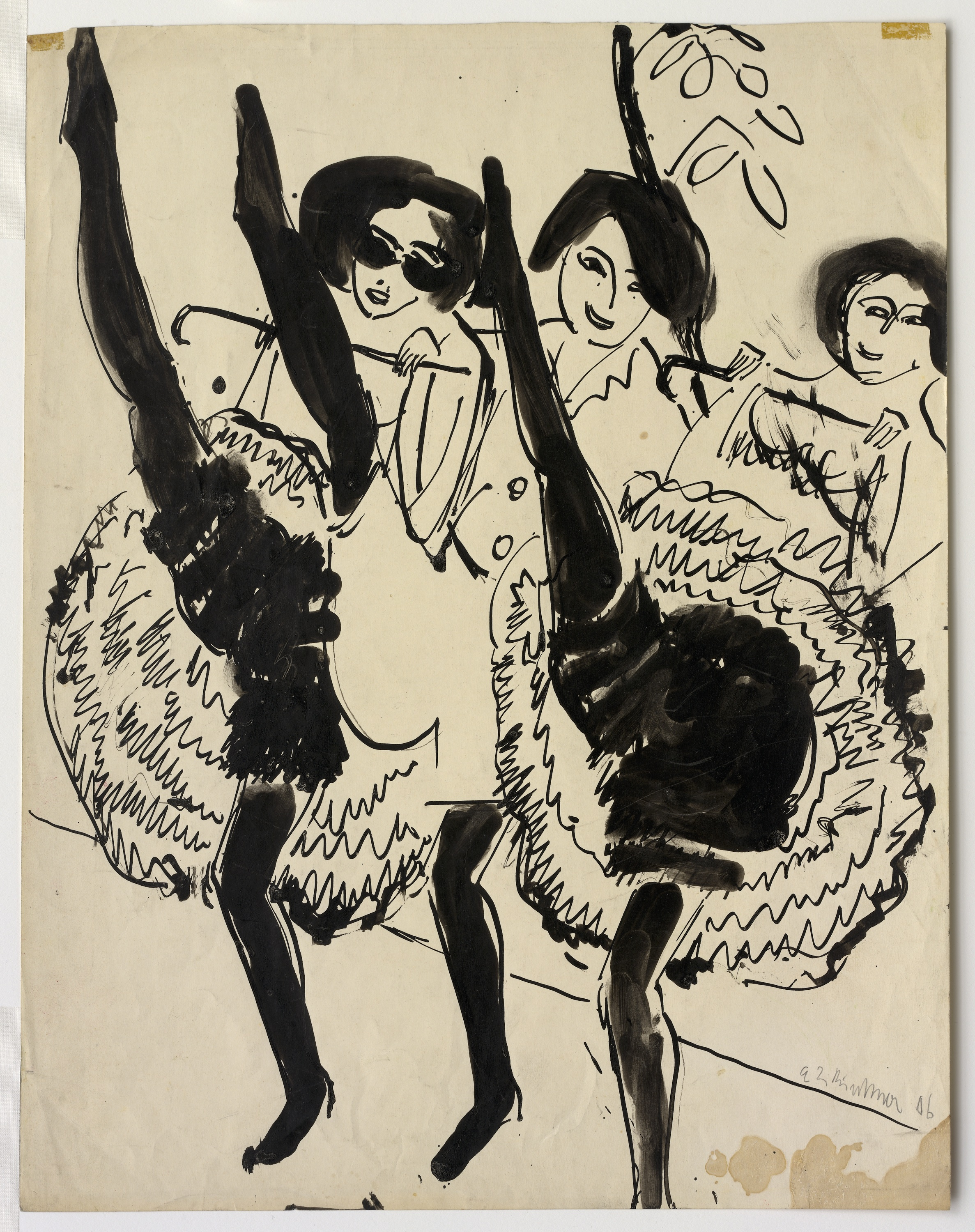
Dancers, 1906, Solomon R. Guggenheim Museum

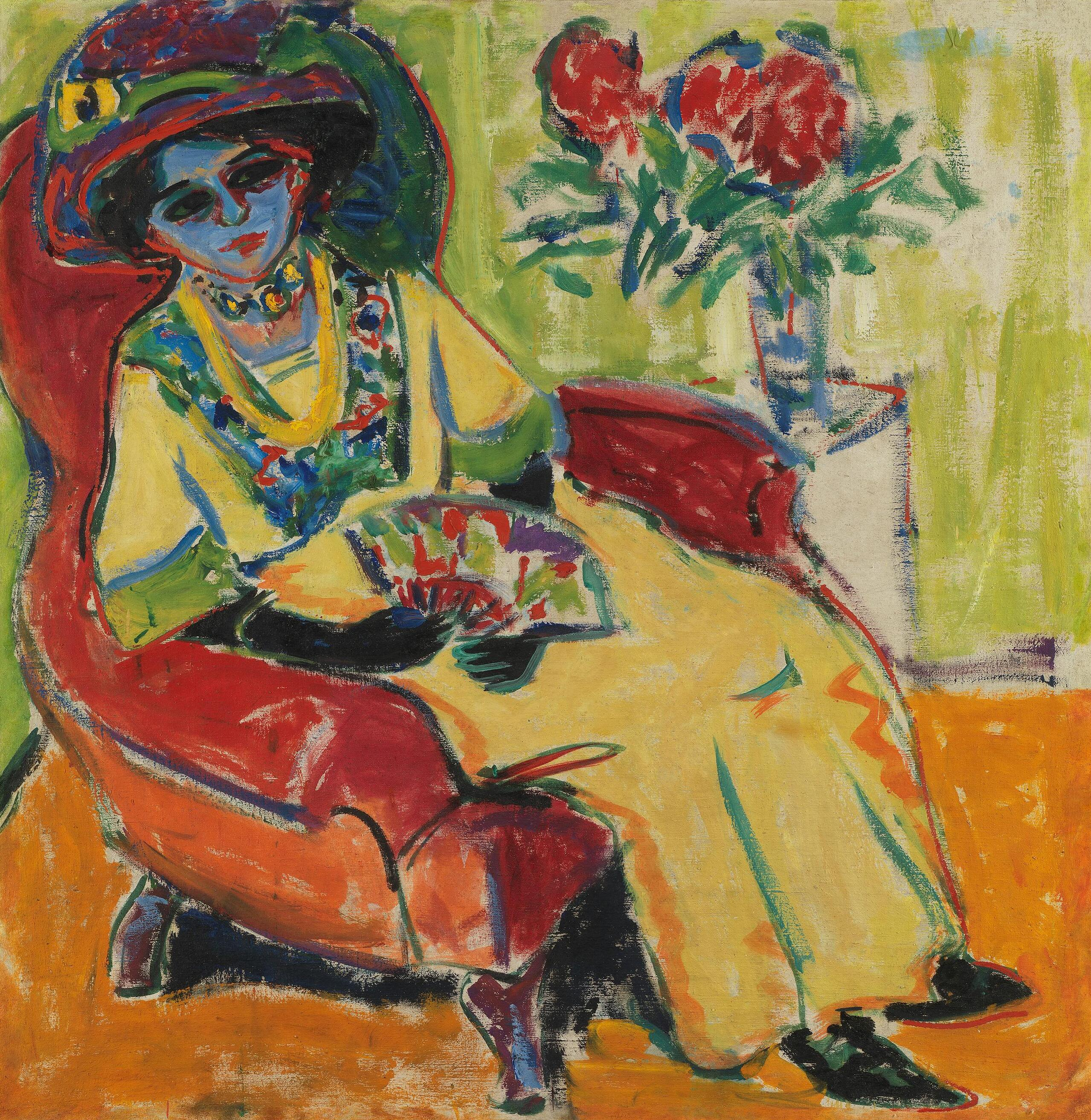
Sitting Woman (Dodo), 1907, Pinakothek der Moderne, Munich

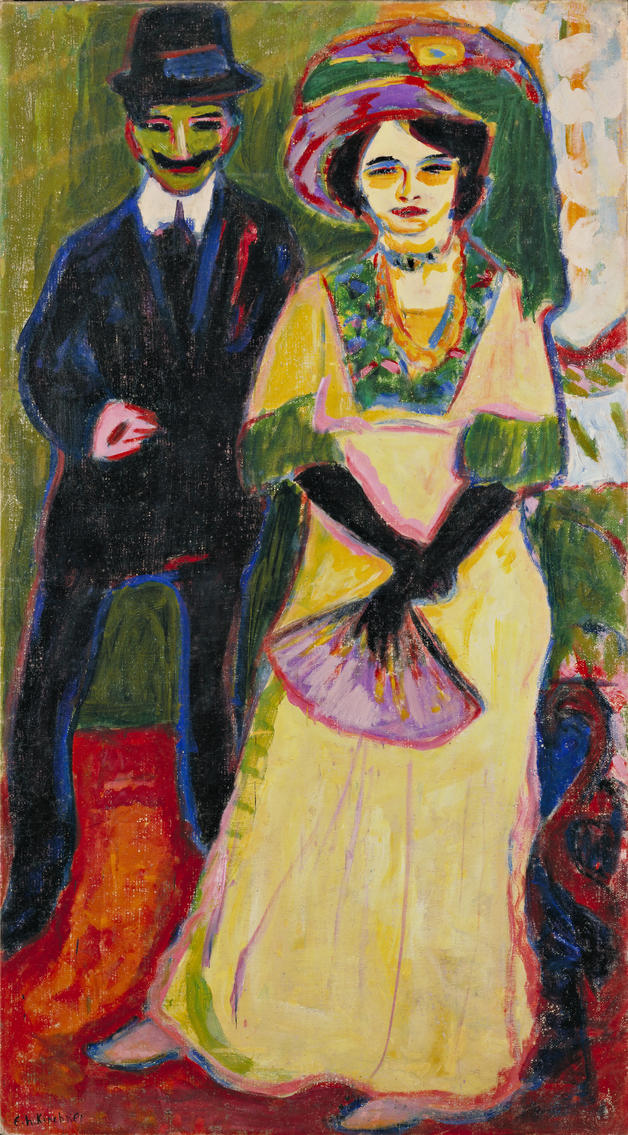
Dodo and her brother, c. 1908, Smith College Museum of Art

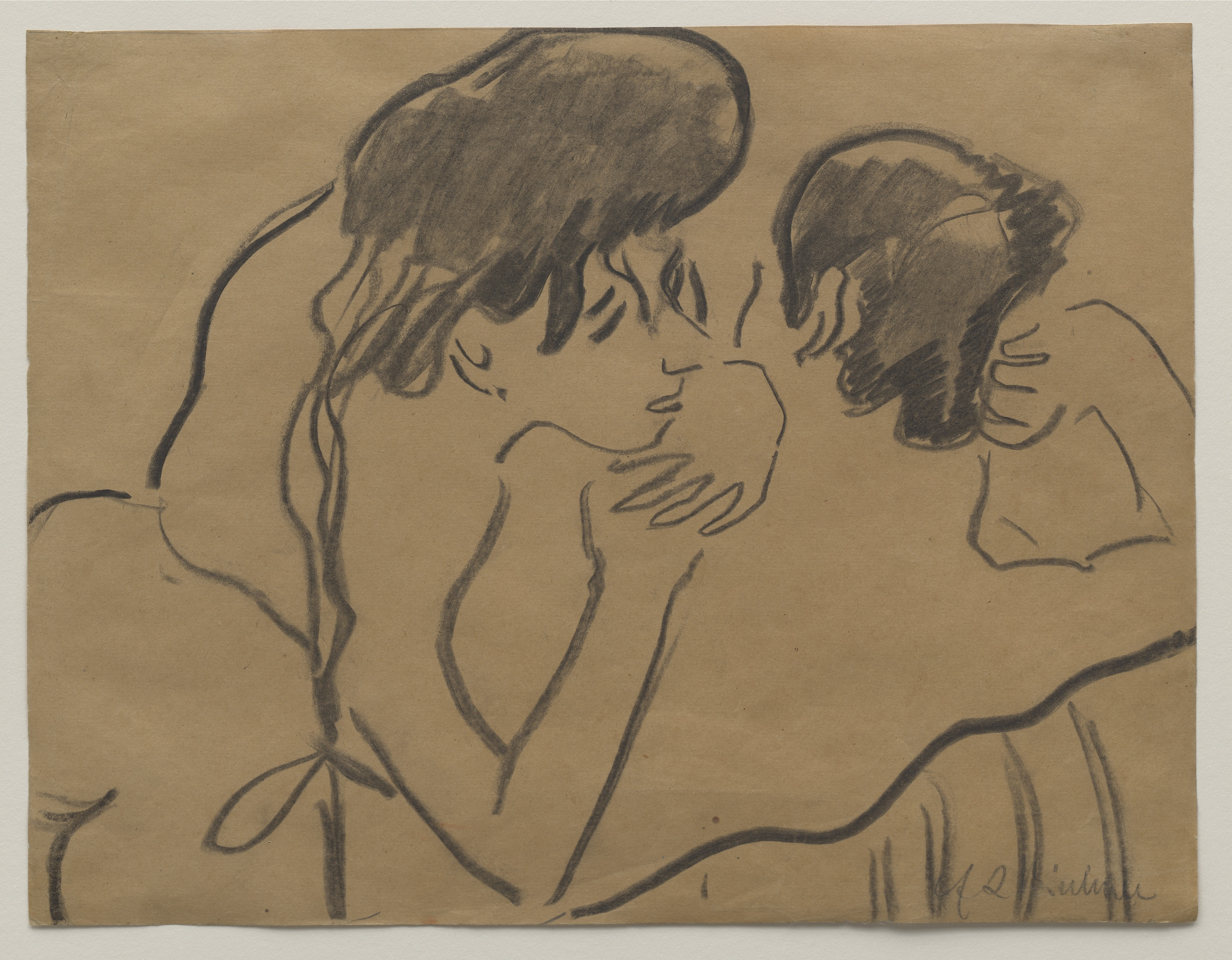
Nudes, ca. 1908, Solomon R. Guggenheim Museum

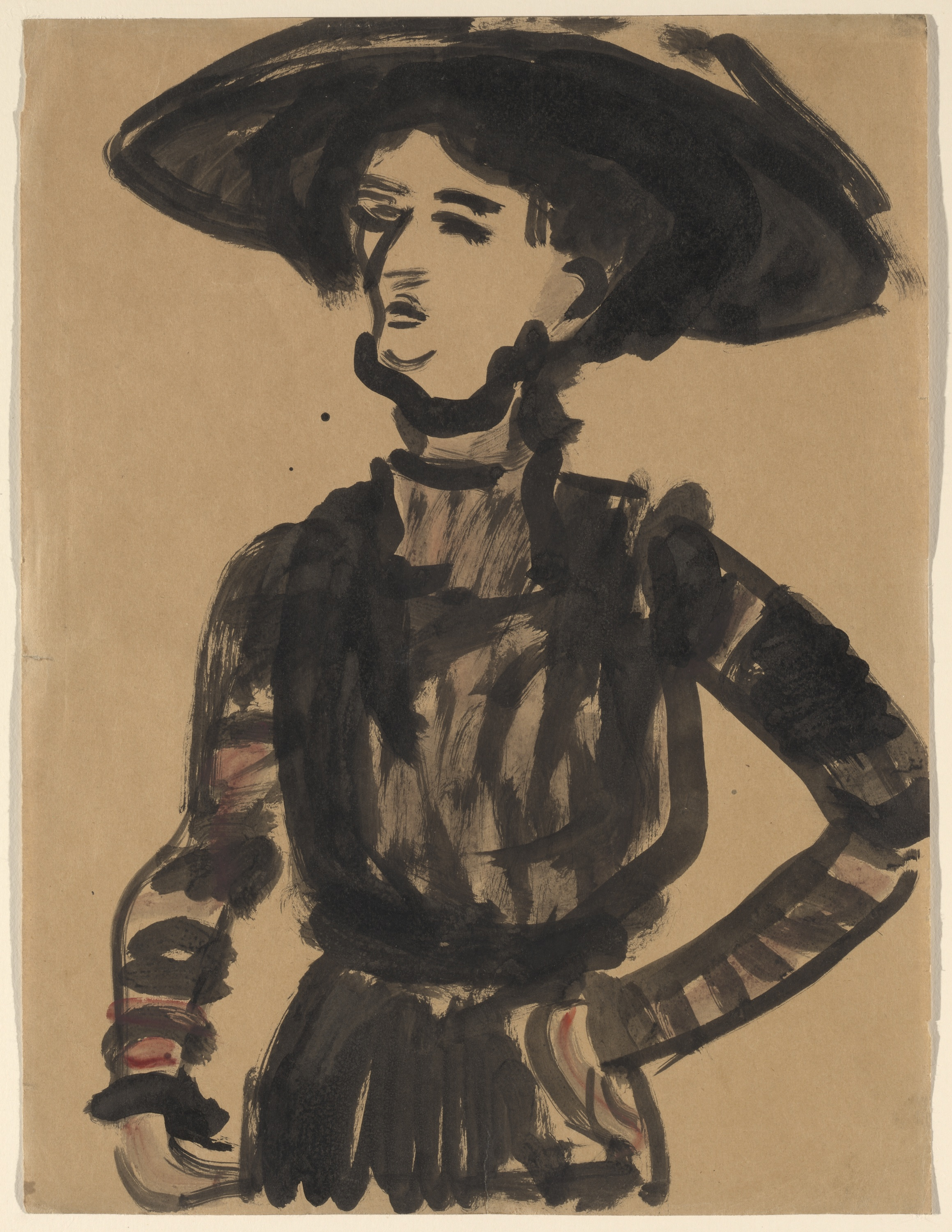
Woman with Black Hat, 1908, Solomon R. Guggenheim Museum

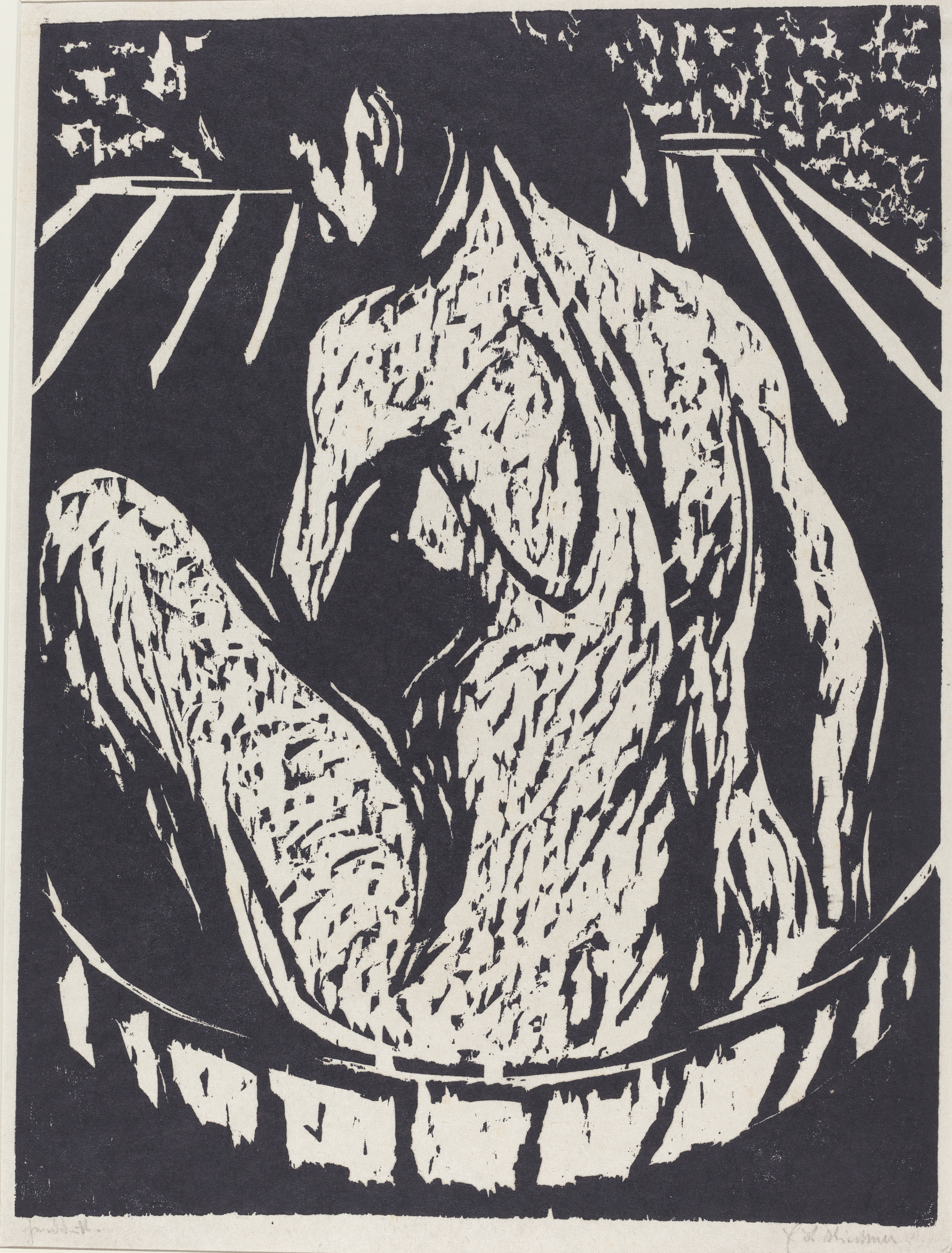
Female Nude, 1908, National Gallery of Art

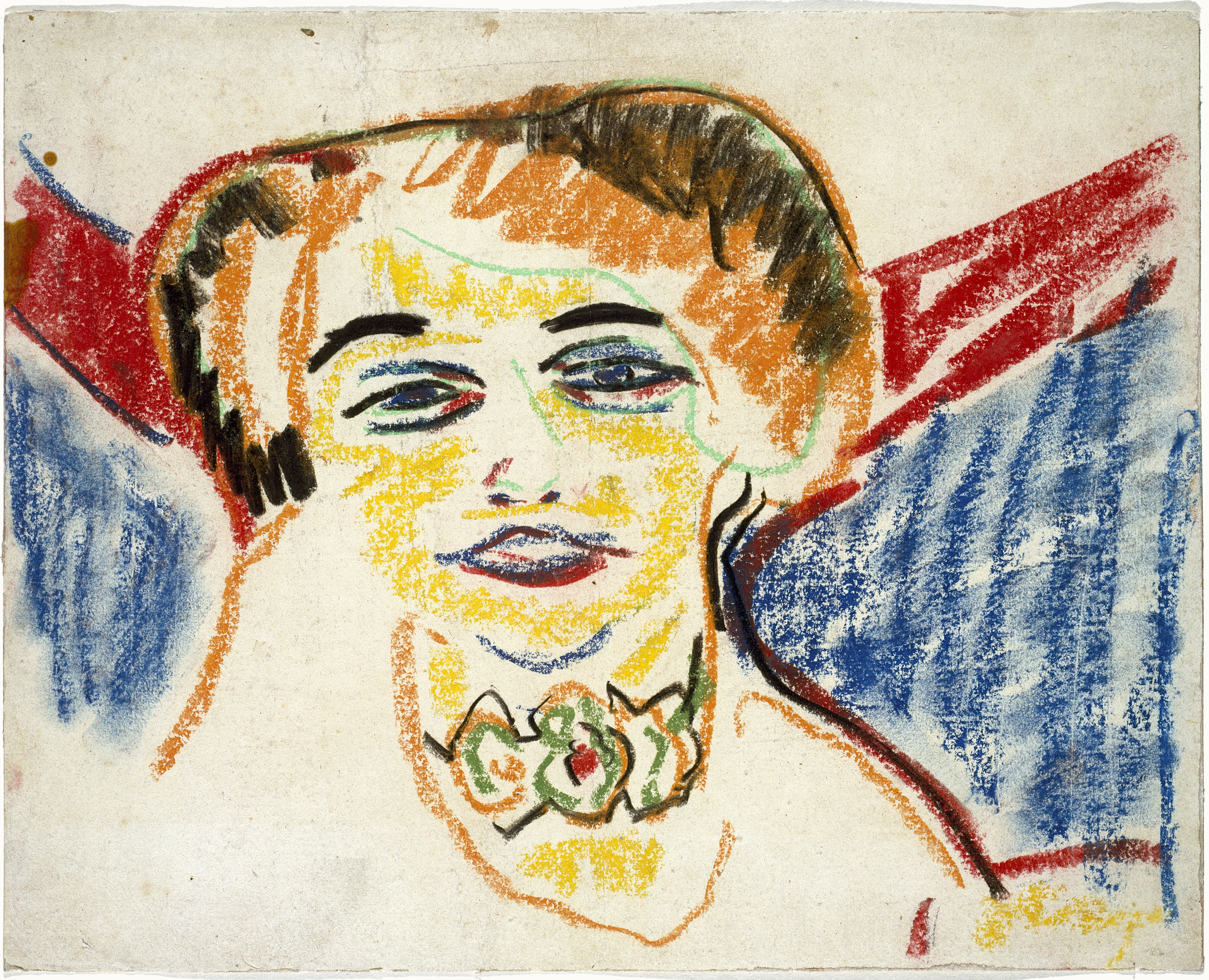
Head of a Woman, ca. 1909, Solomon R. Guggenheim Museum

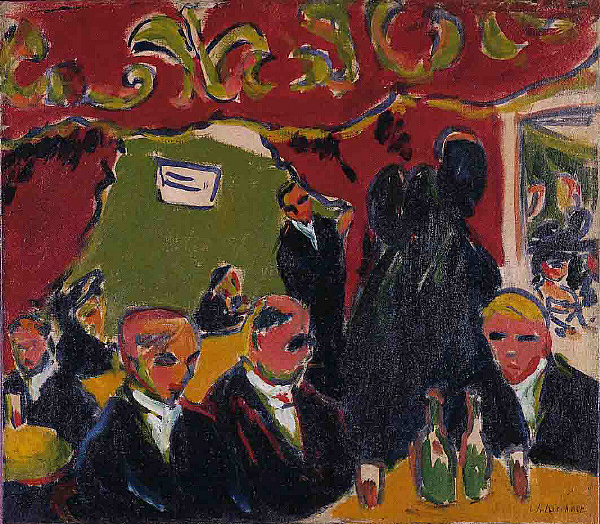
Tavern, 1909, Saint Louis Art Museum, Saint Louis

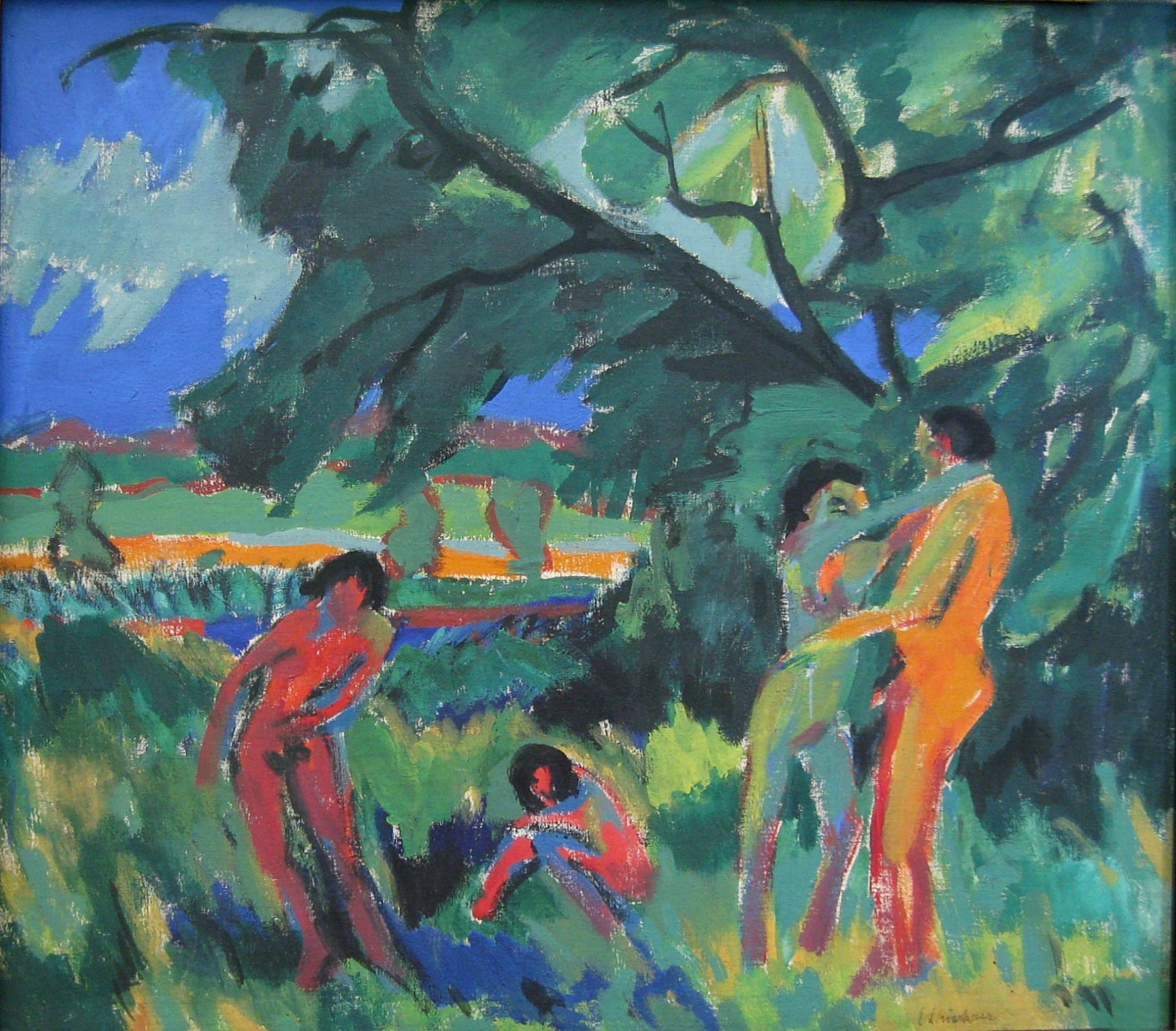
Naked Playing People, 1910, Pinakothek der Moderne, Munich

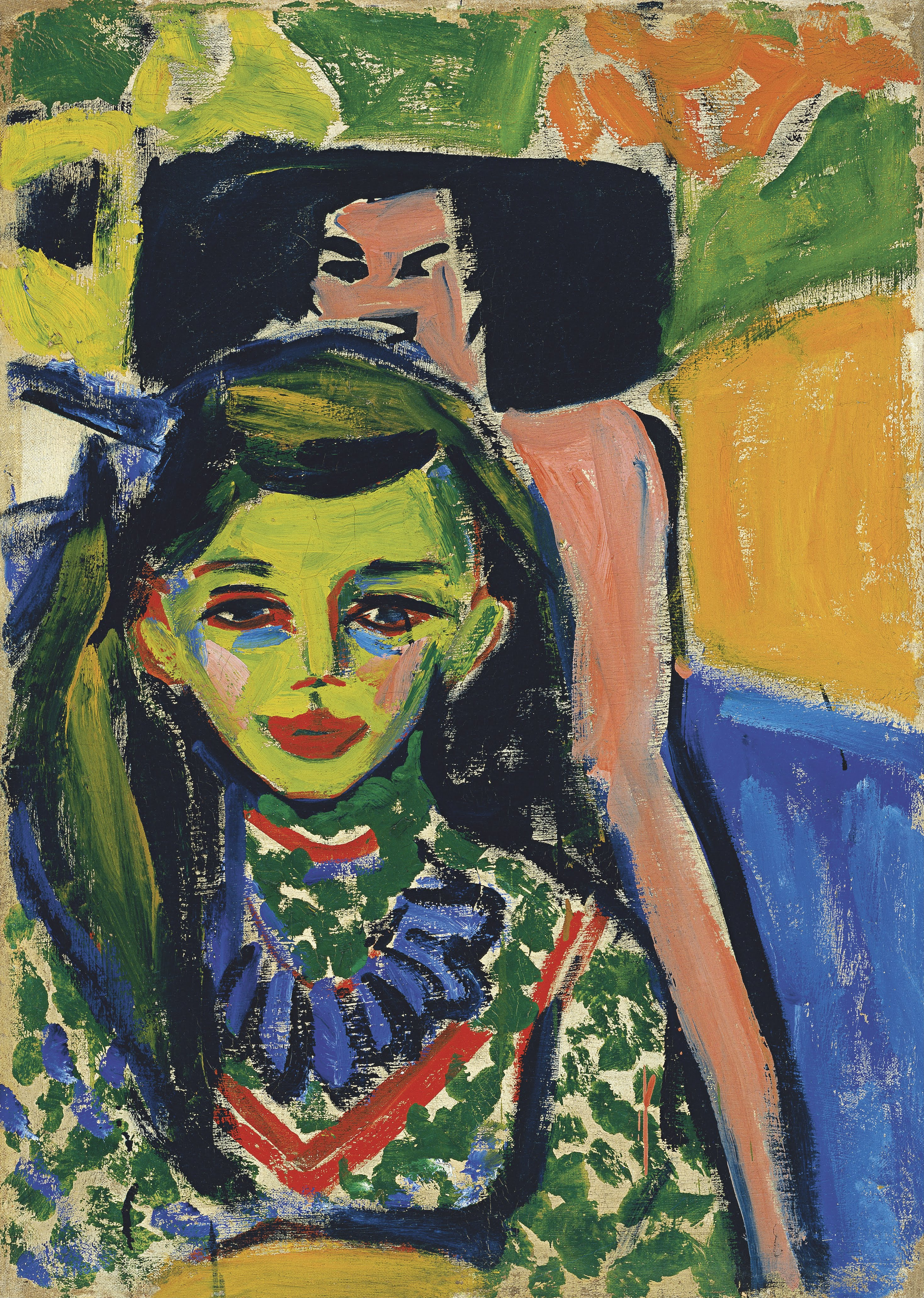
Fränzi in front of Carved Chair, 1910, Museo Thyssen-Bornemisza, Madrid

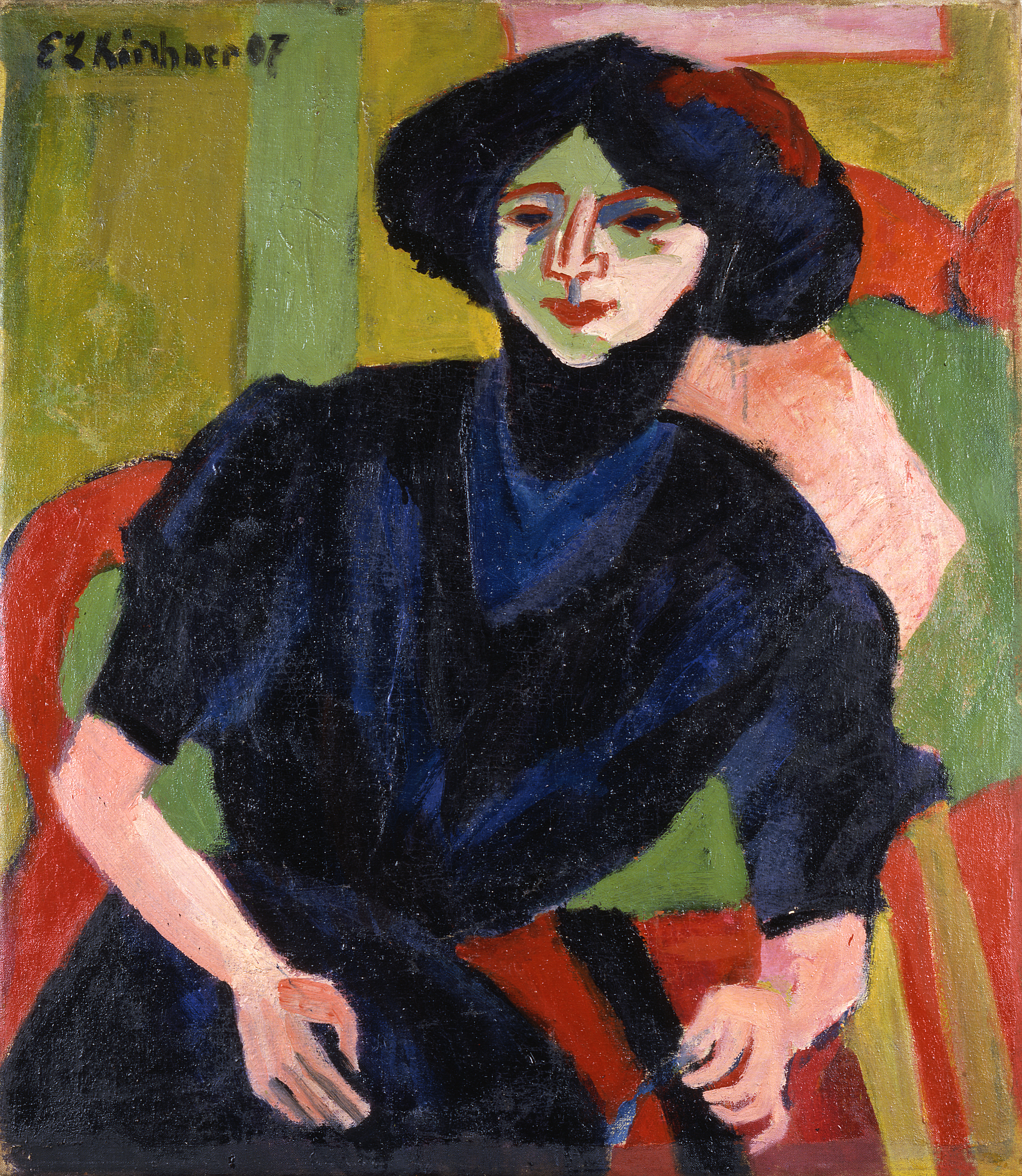
Portrait of a Woman, 1911, Saint Louis Art Museum

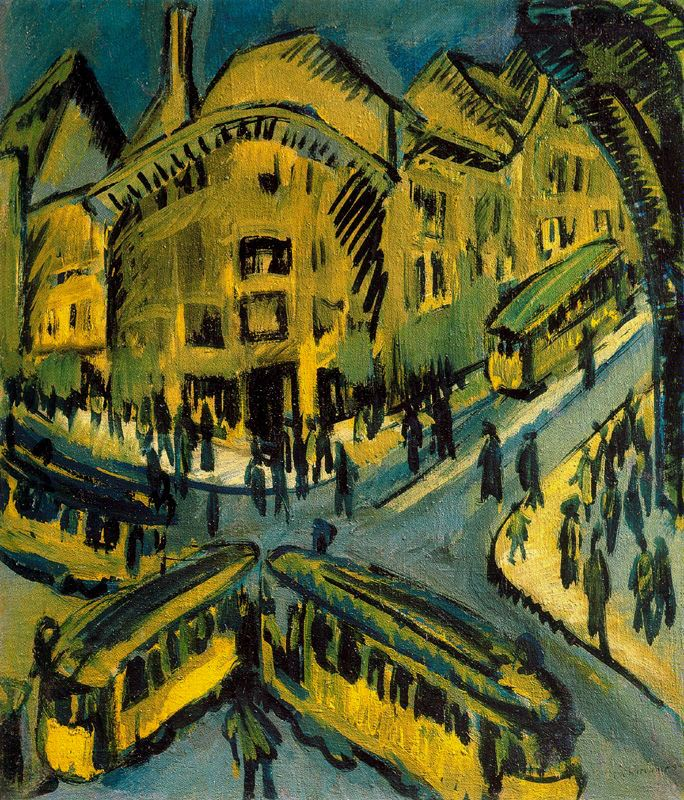
Nollendorfplatz, 1912, Stiftung Stadtmuseum Berlin

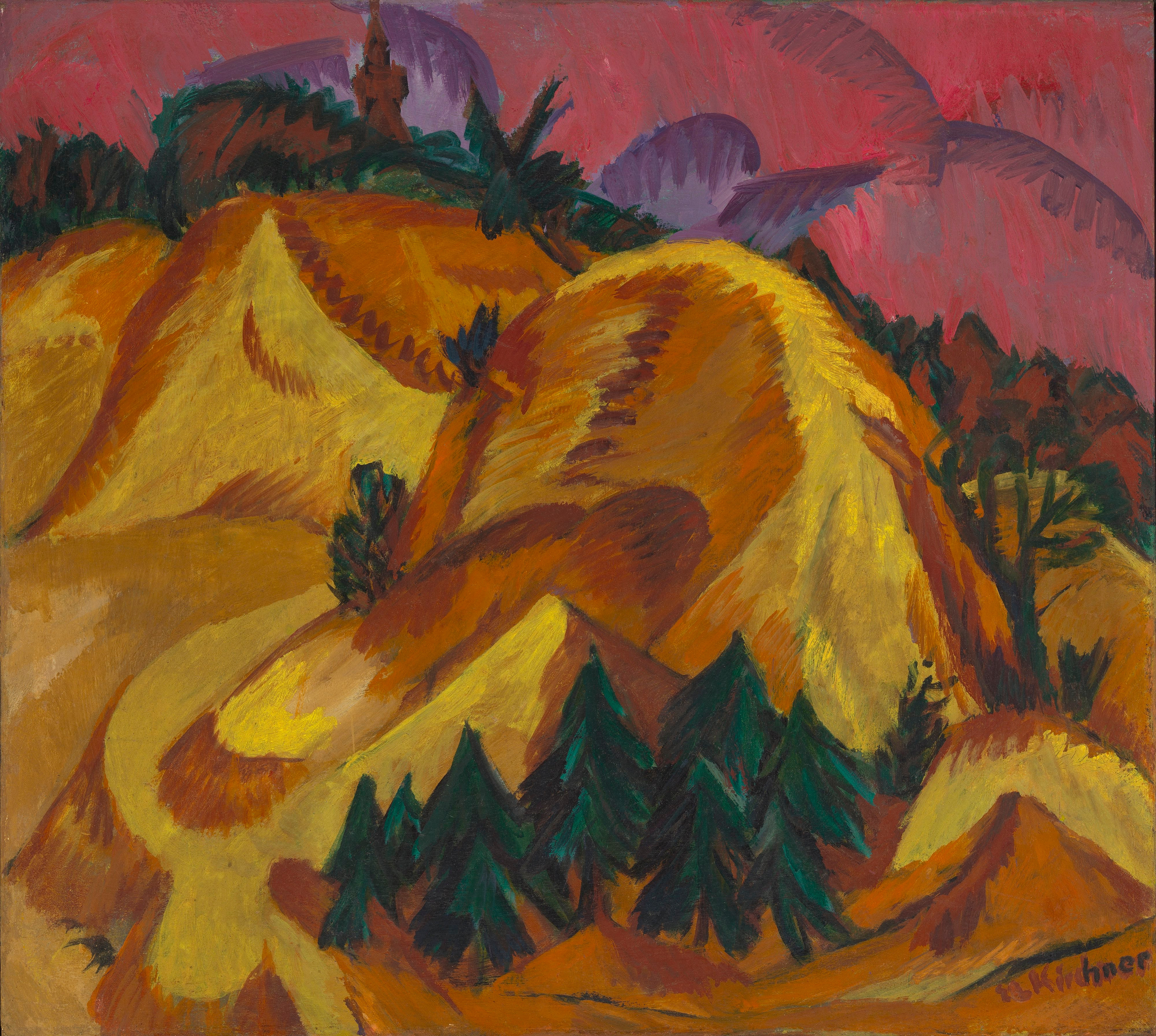
Sand Hills near Grünau, 1913, Virginia Museum of Fine Arts

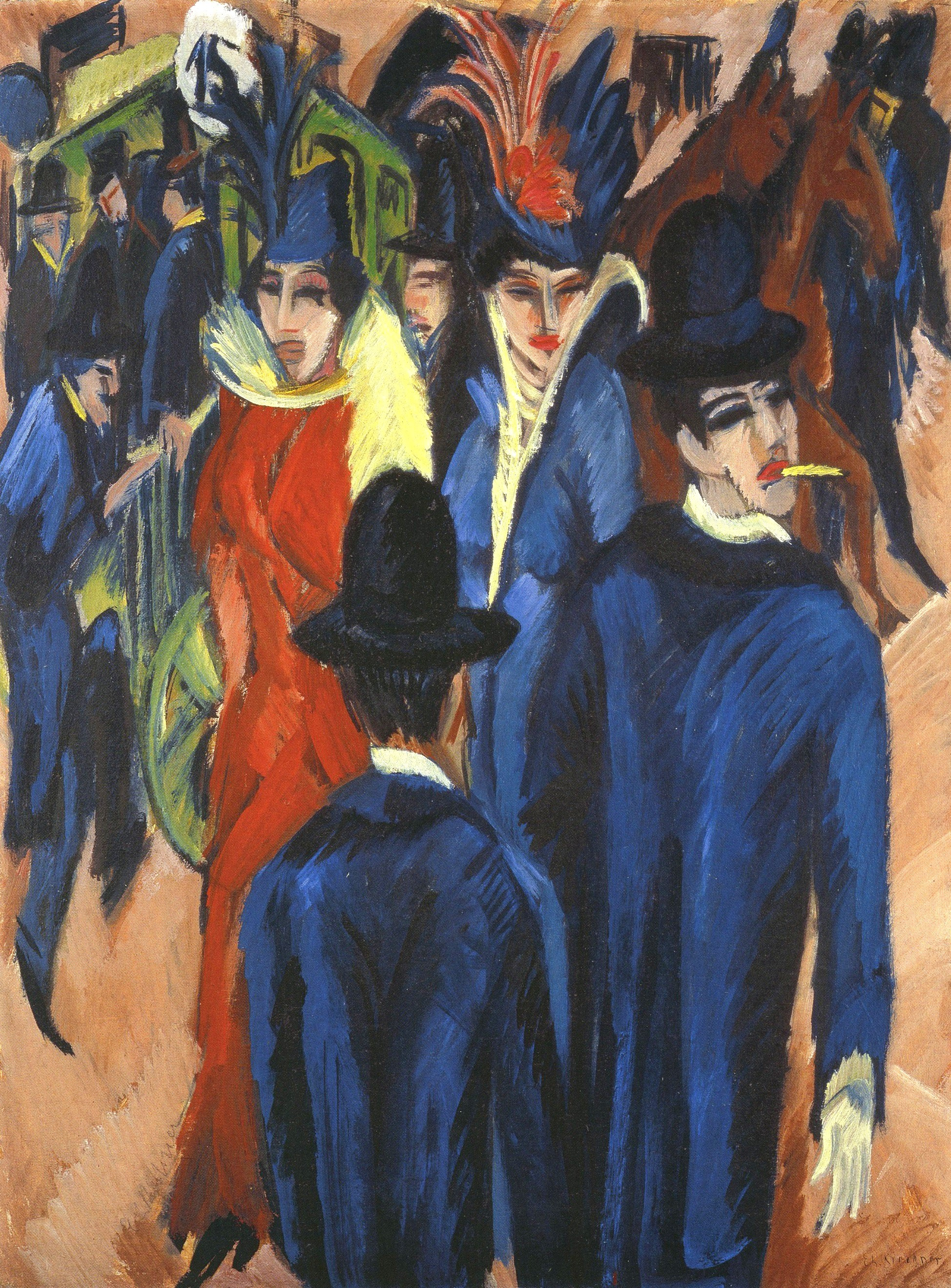
Berlin Street Scene, 1913, Neue Galerie

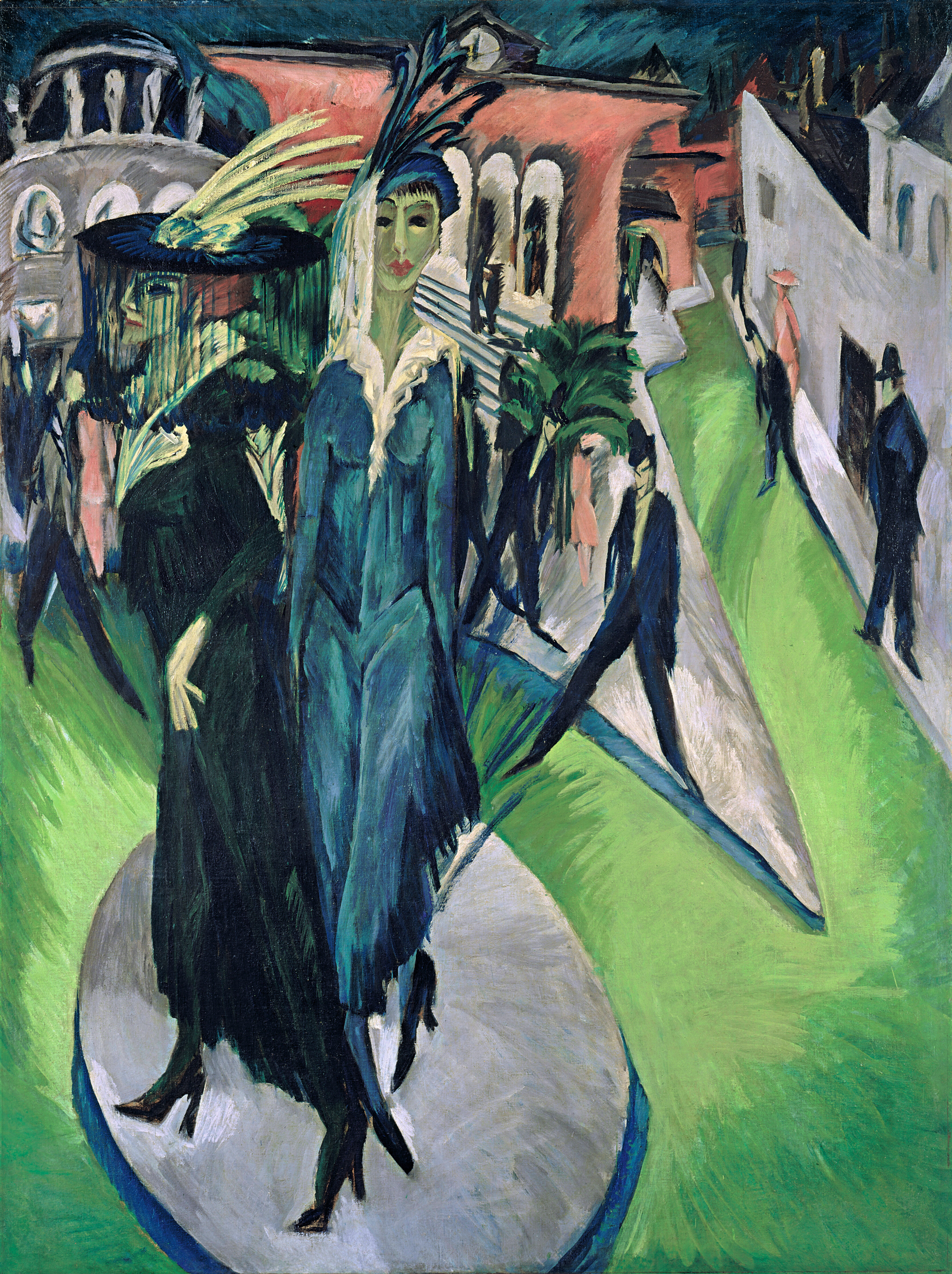
Potsdamer Platz, 1914, Neue Nationalgalerie, Berlin

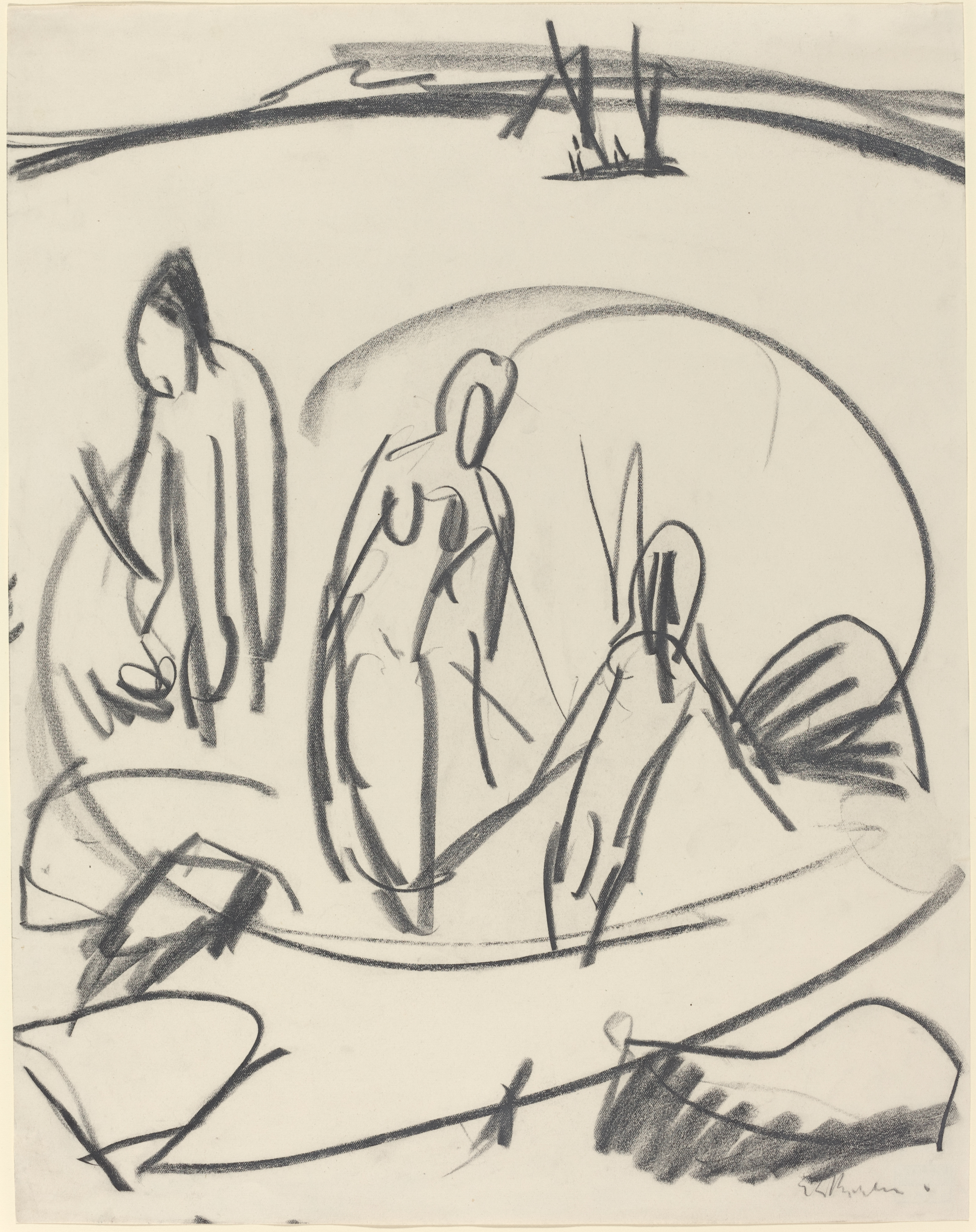
Three Bathers in the Sea, c. 1914, National Gallery of Art

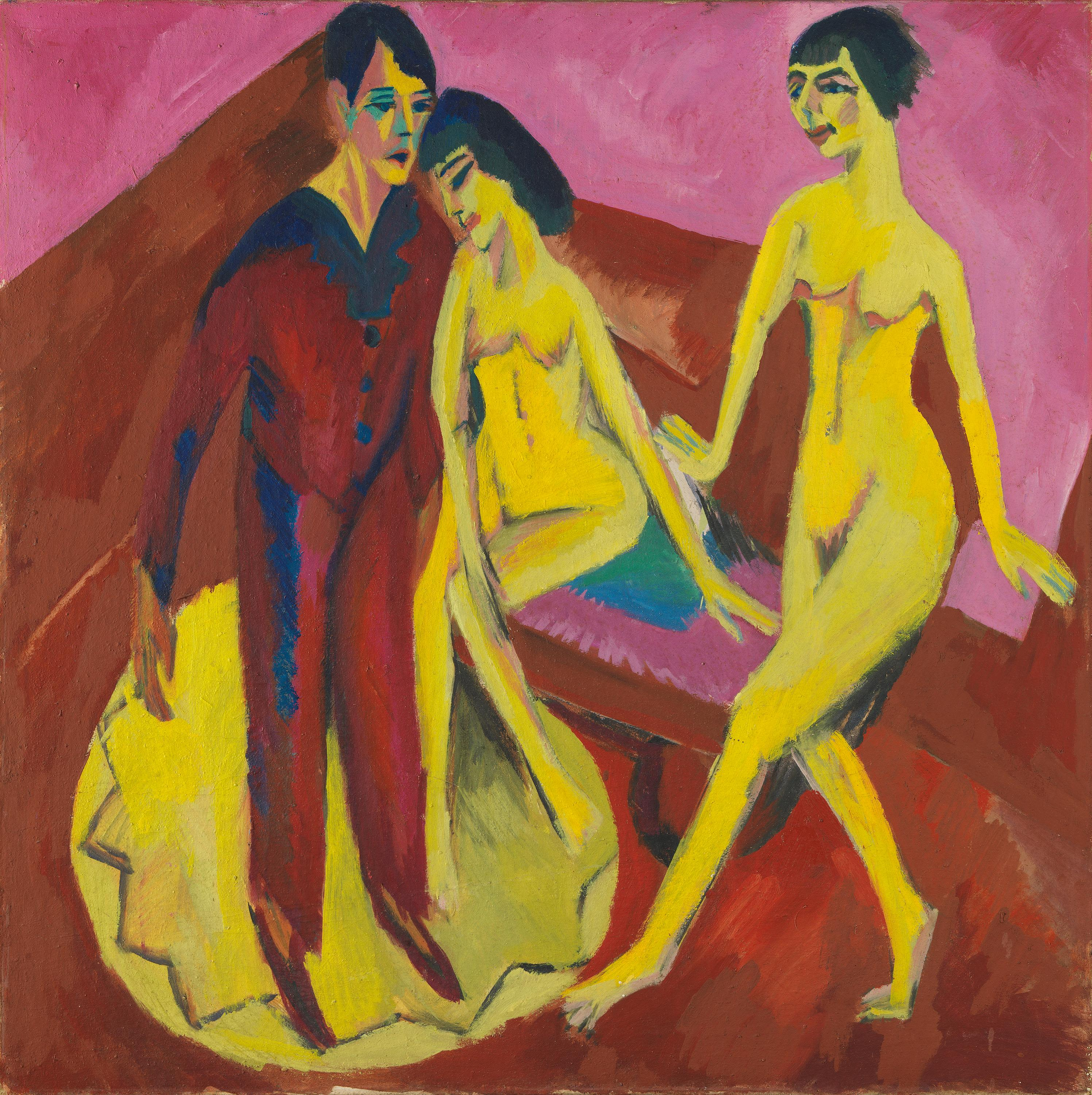
Dance School, 1914, Pinakothek der Moderne

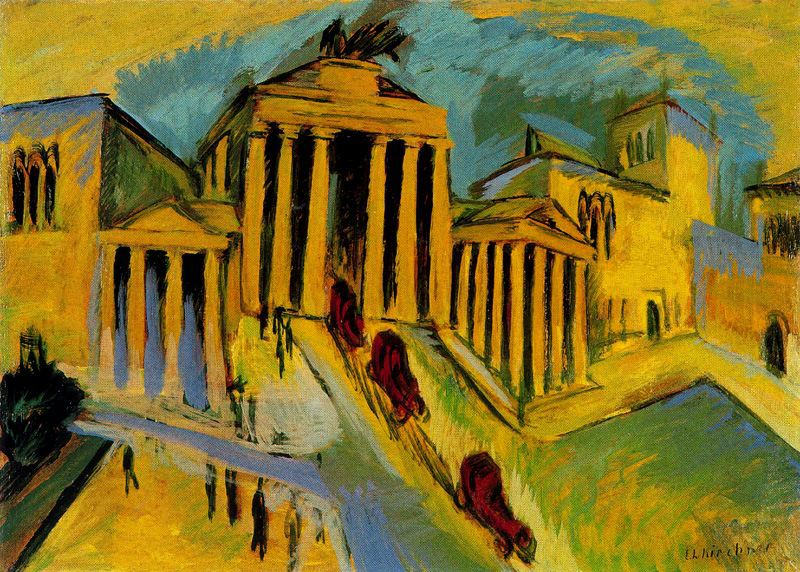
Brandenburger Tor, 1915, private Collection Würth in Germany

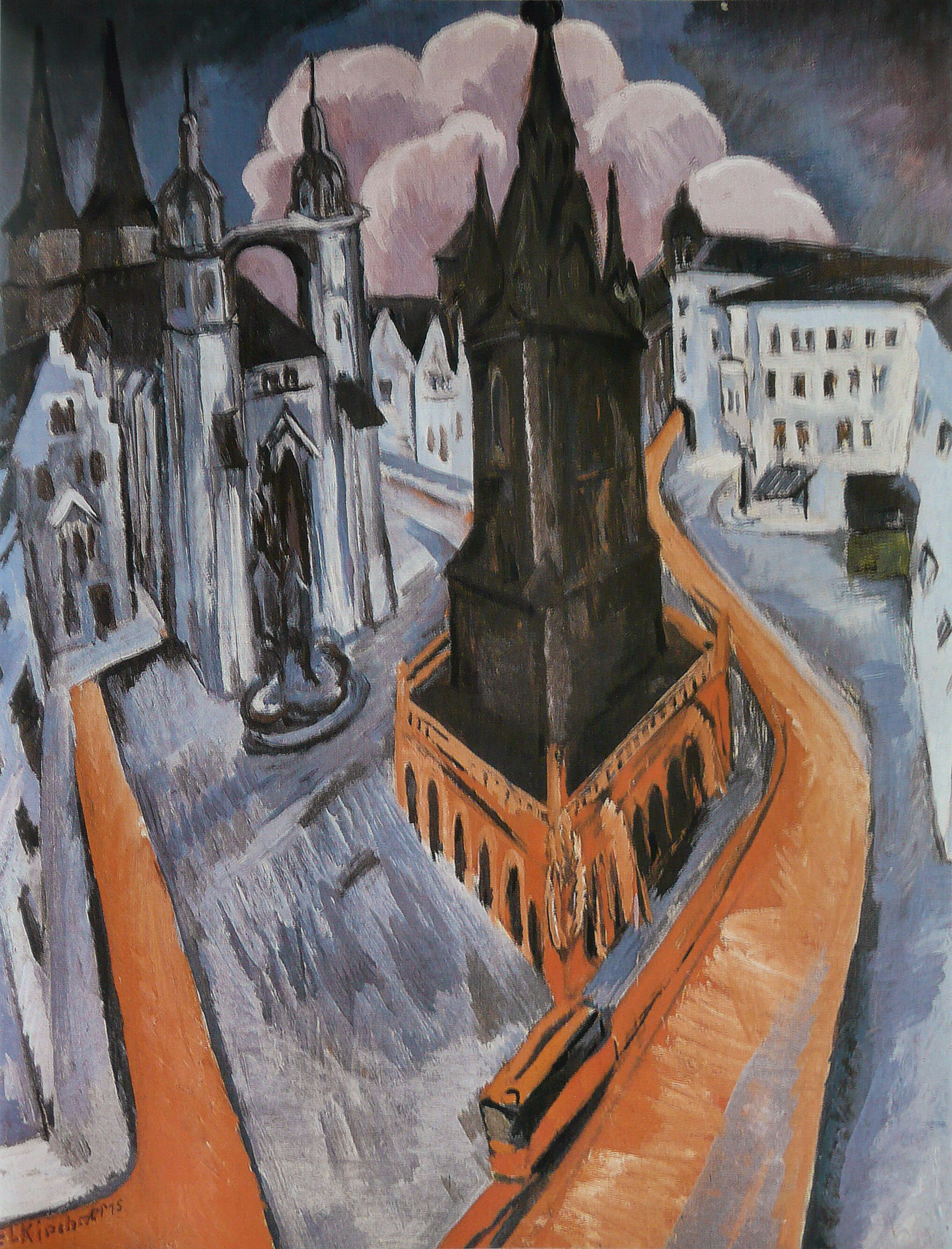
Der Rote Turm in Halle, 1915, Museum Folkwang

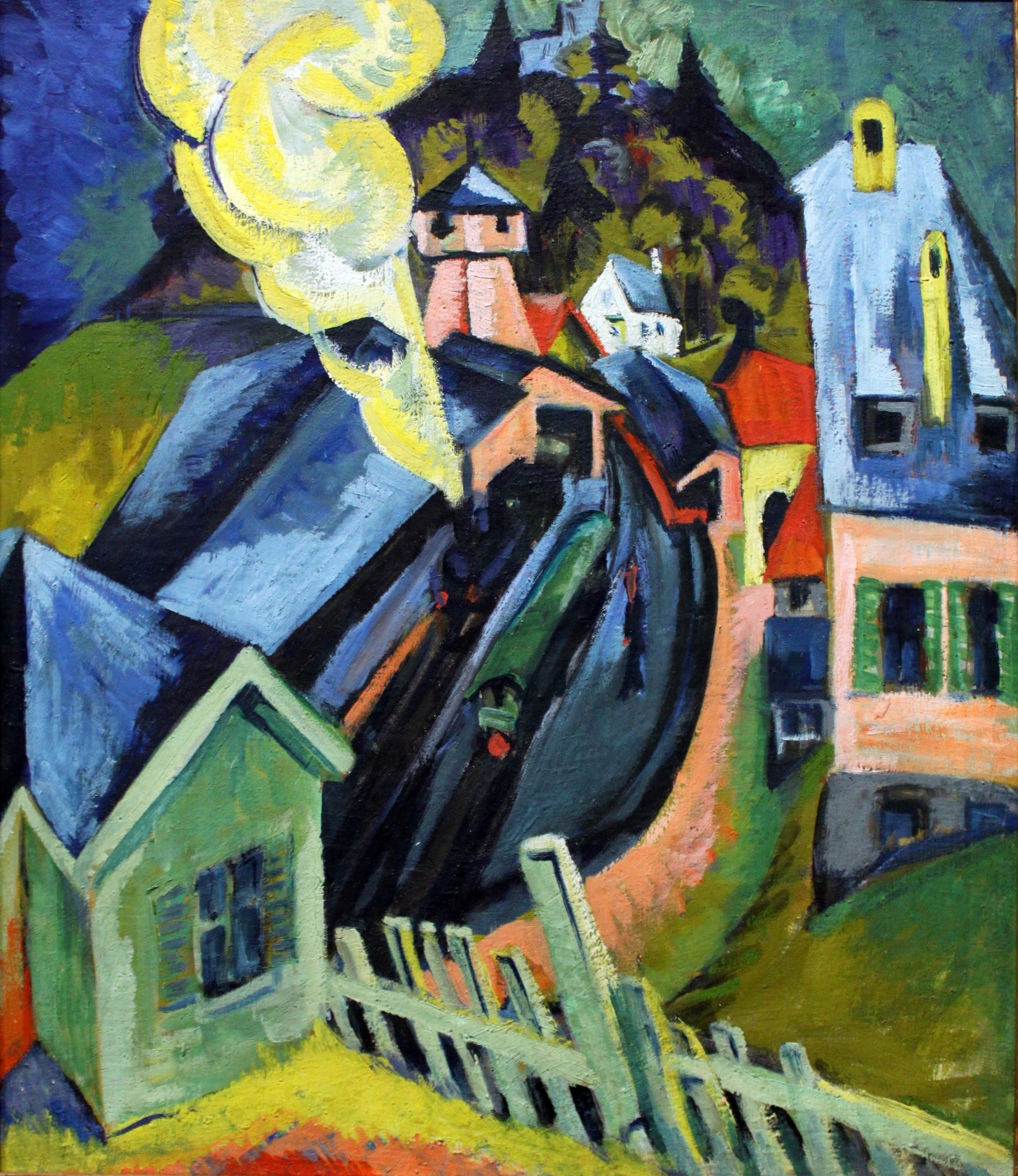
Königstein Station, 1916, Städel, Frankfurt am Main

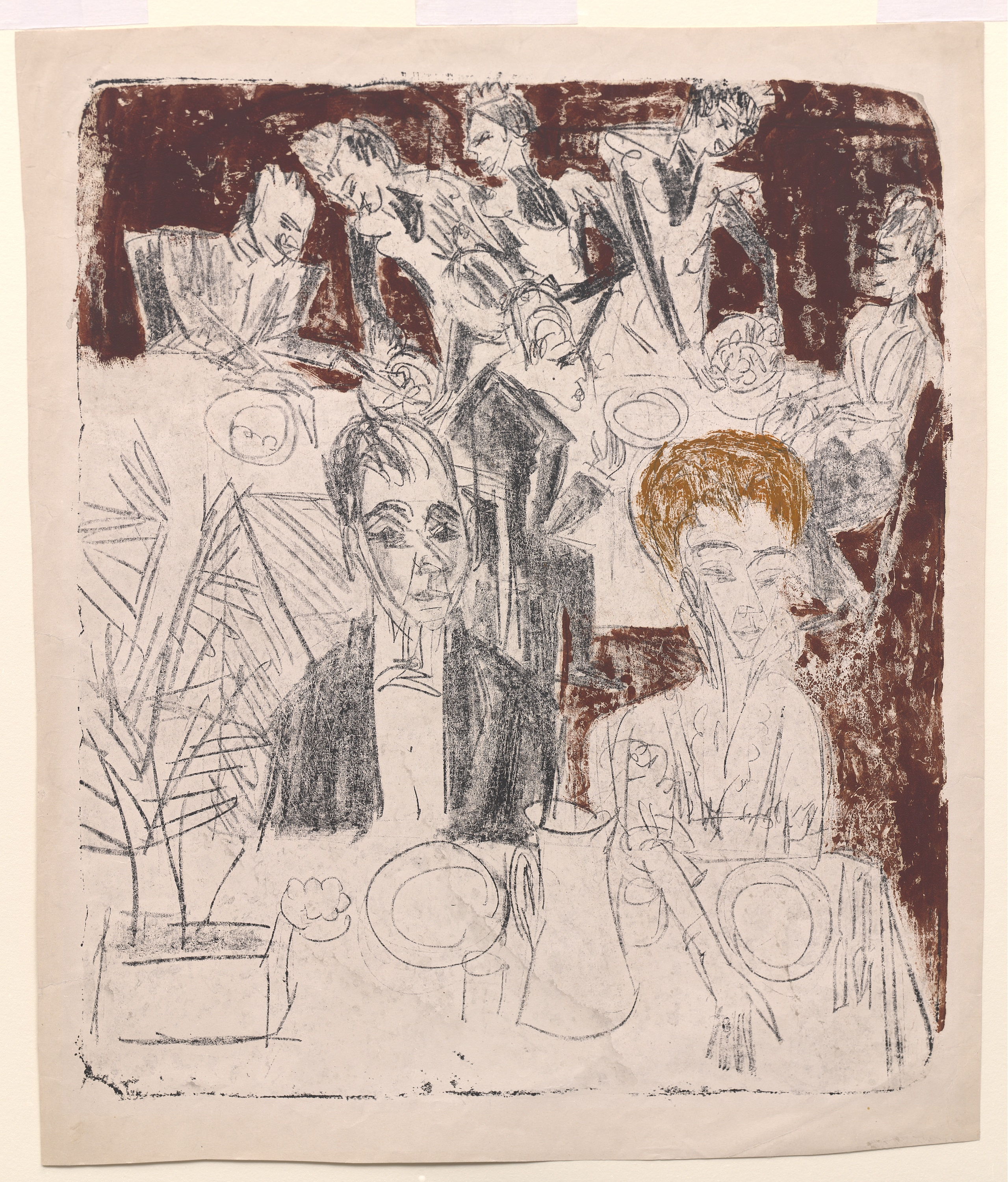
At the Table, 1916, Solomon R. Guggenheim Museum

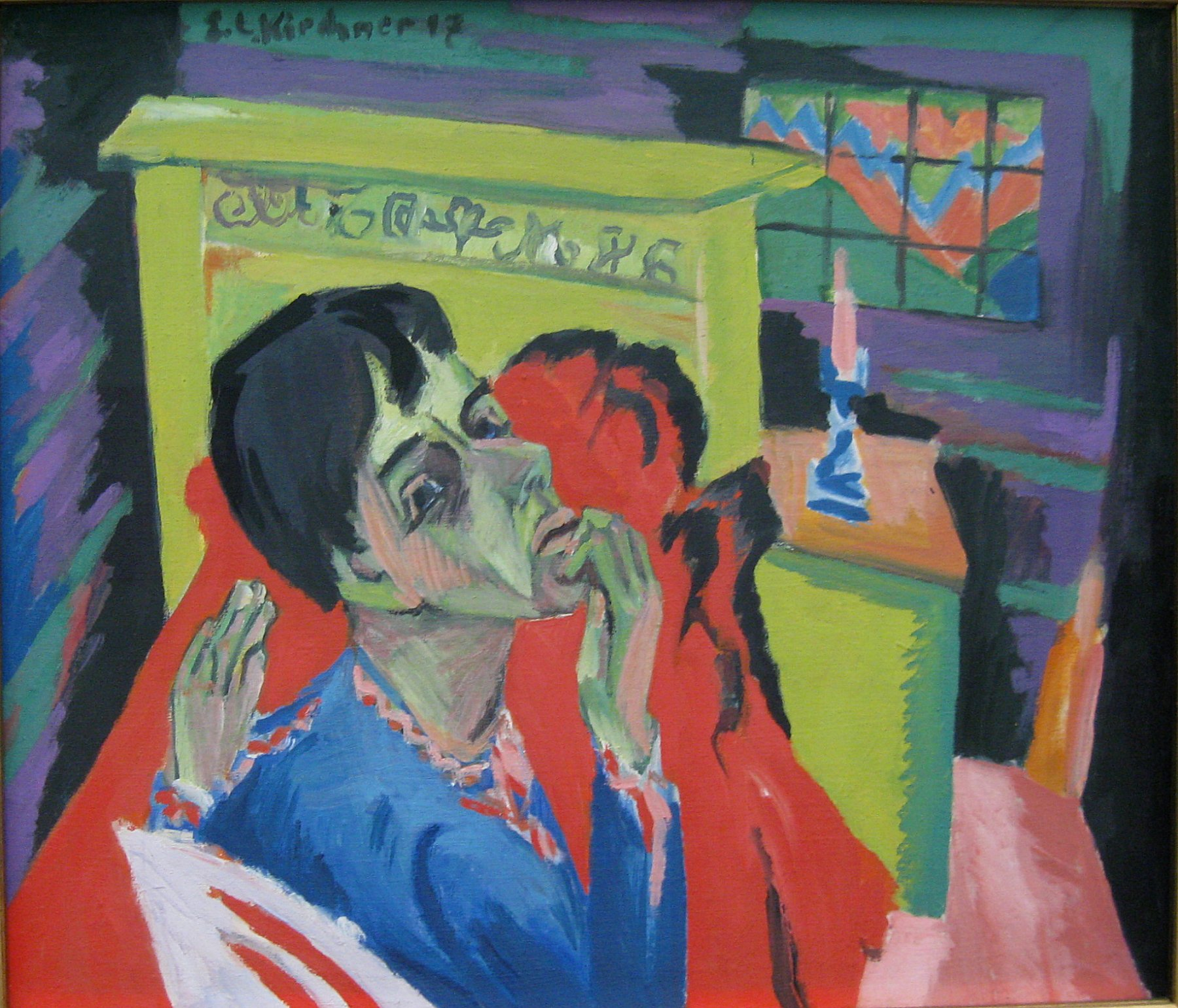
Self-portrait as a
Sick Person, 1918, Pinakothek der Moderne, Munich

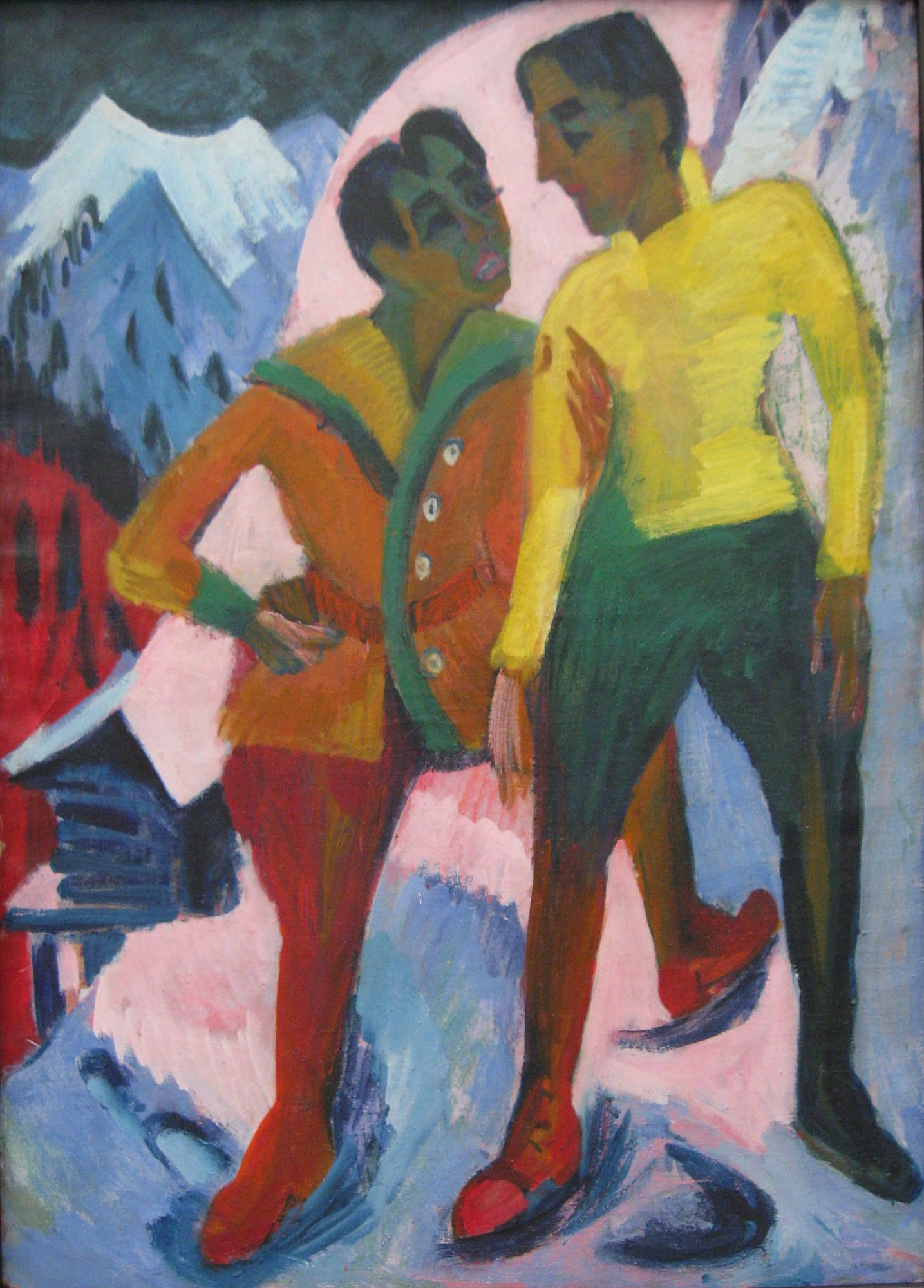
Two Brothers, 1921, Pinakothek der Moderne, Munich

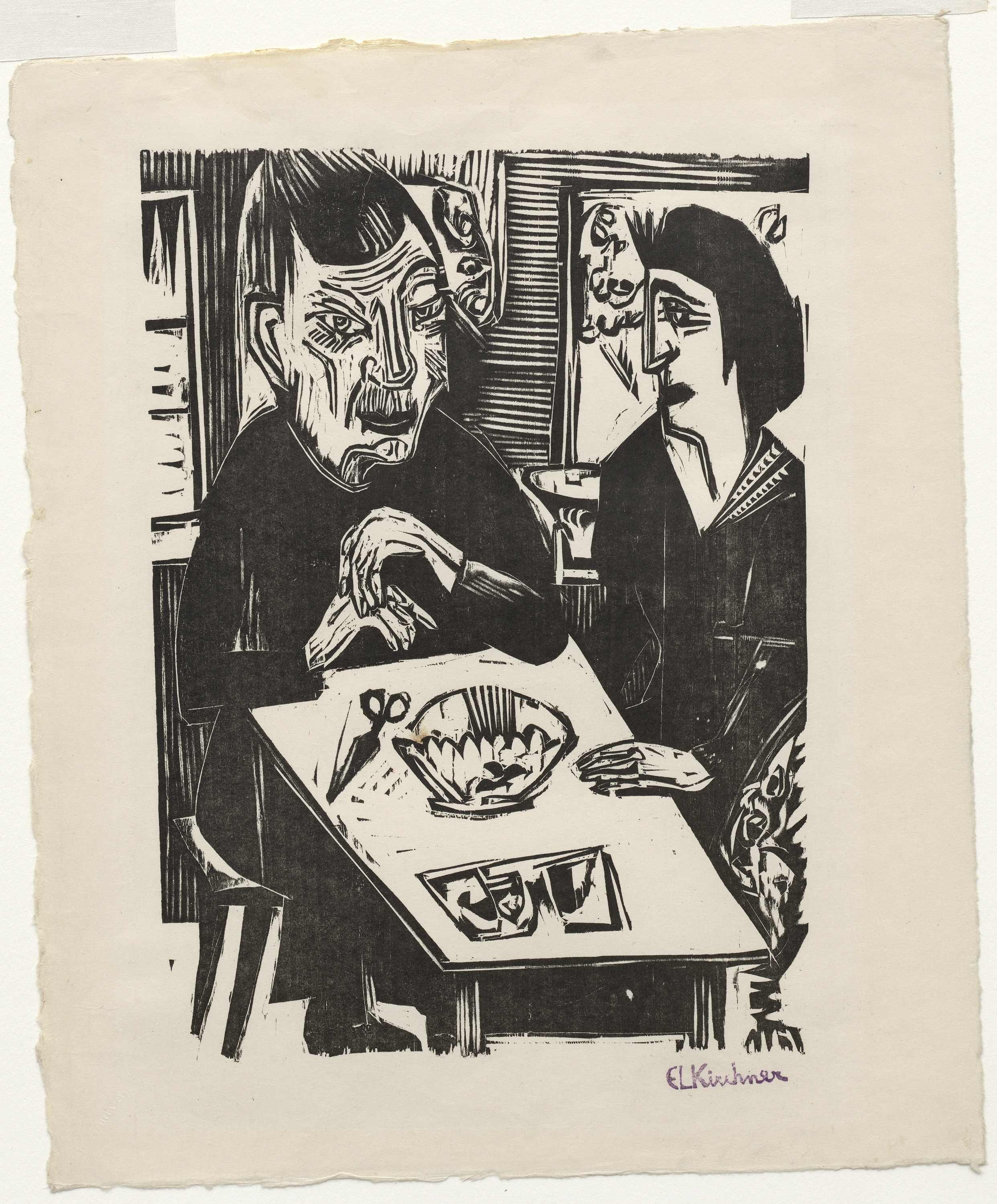
Old Woman and Young Woman, 1921, Solomon R. Guggenheim Museum

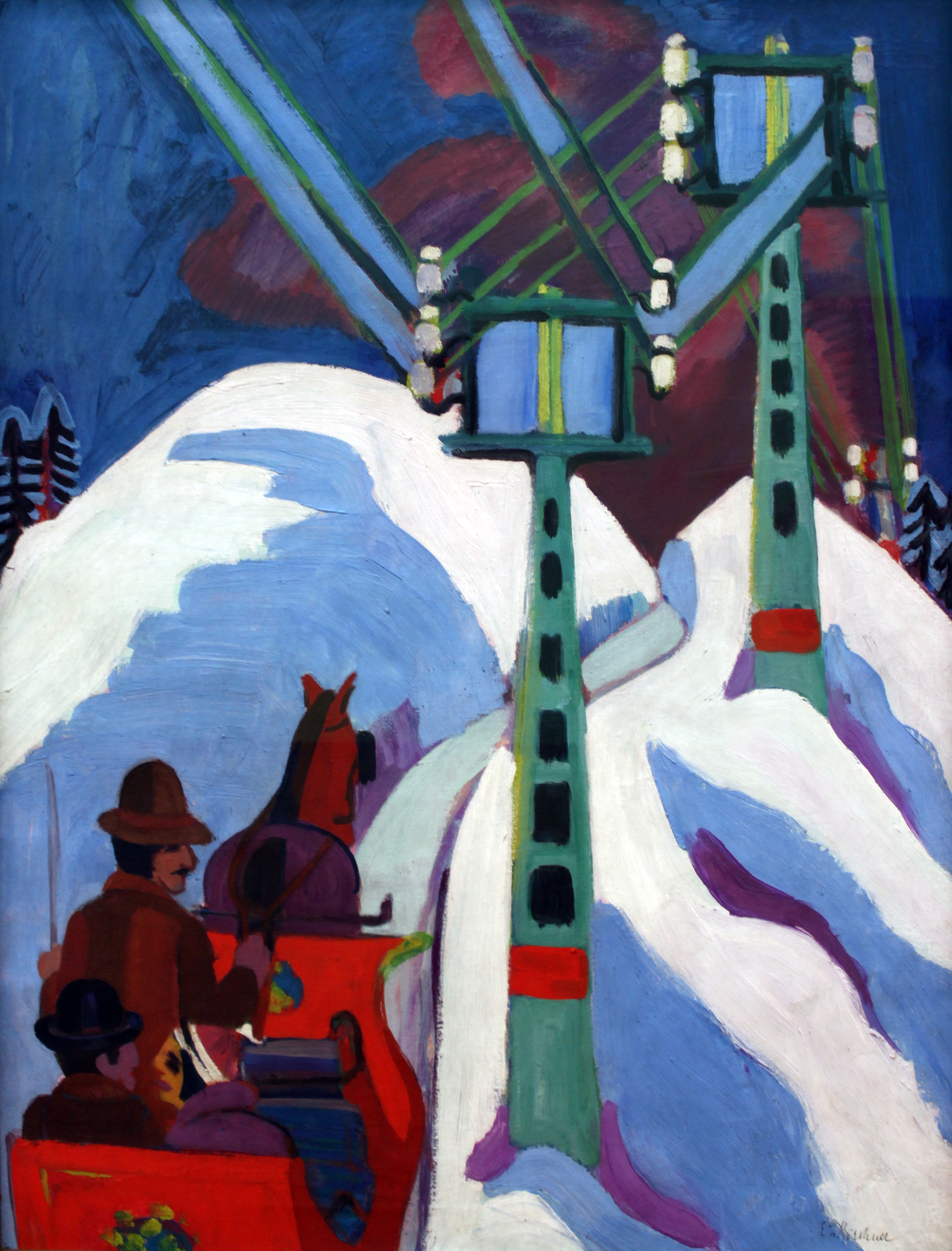
The Sleigh Ride, 1923, Germanisches Nationalmuseum

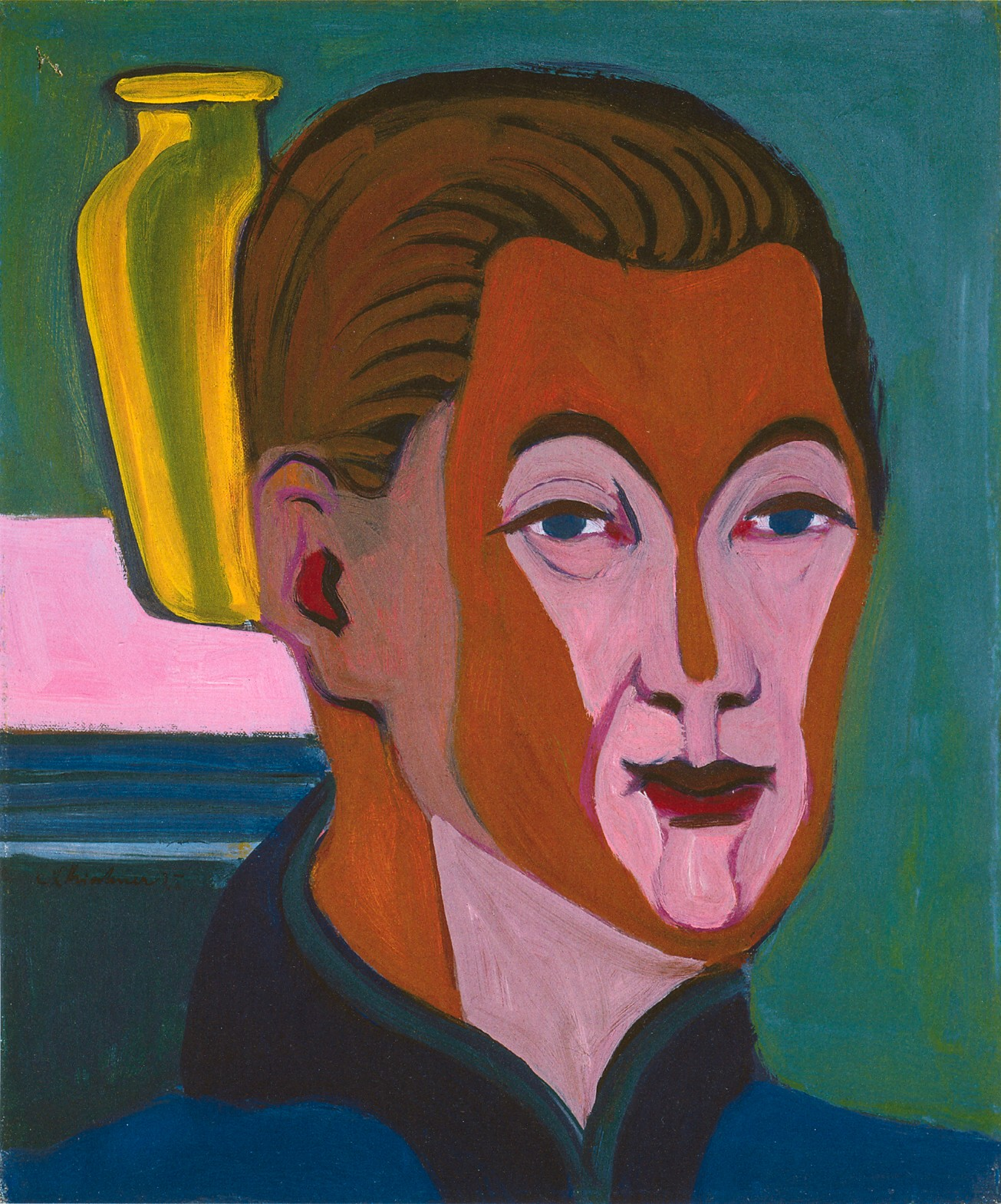
Self portrait, 1925, Kirchner Museum Davos

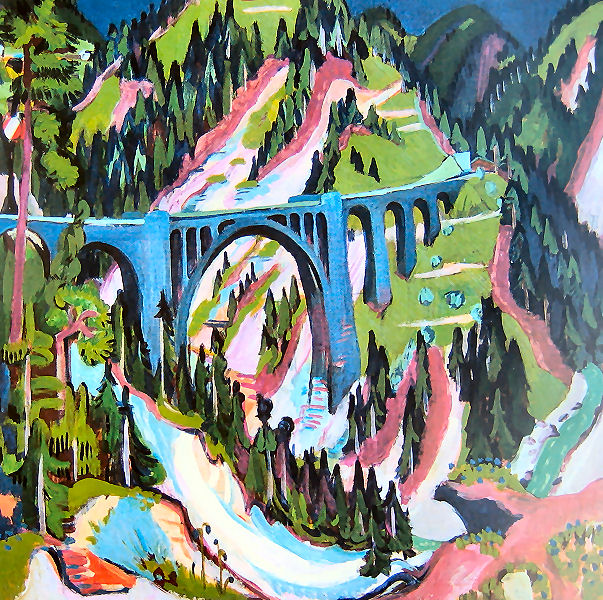
The Bridge near Wiesen, 1926, Kirchner Museum Davos

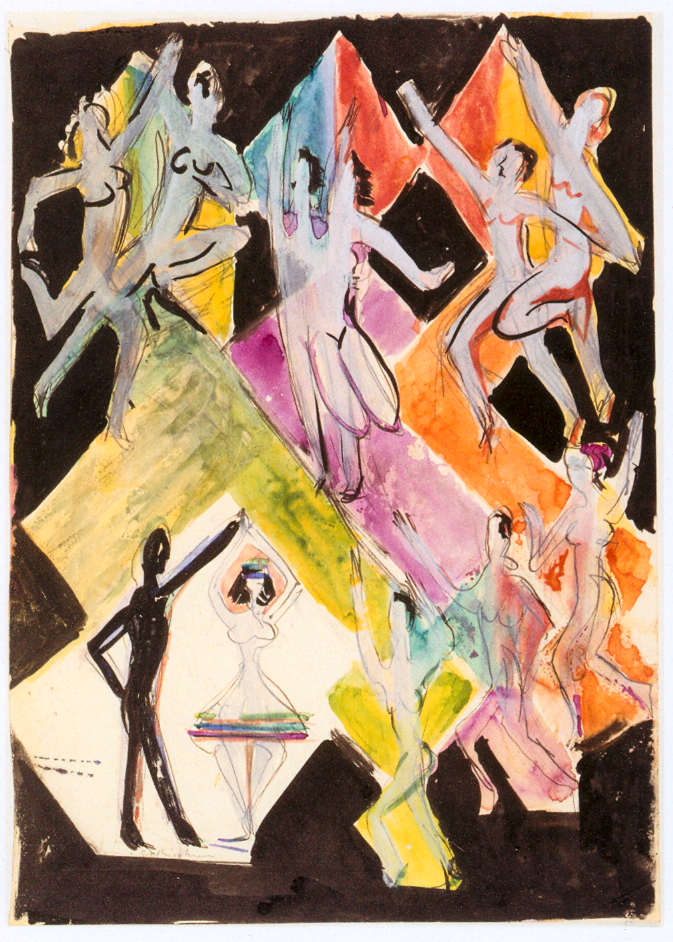
Design for the wall-painting Colourful-dance, 1927, Museum Folkwang

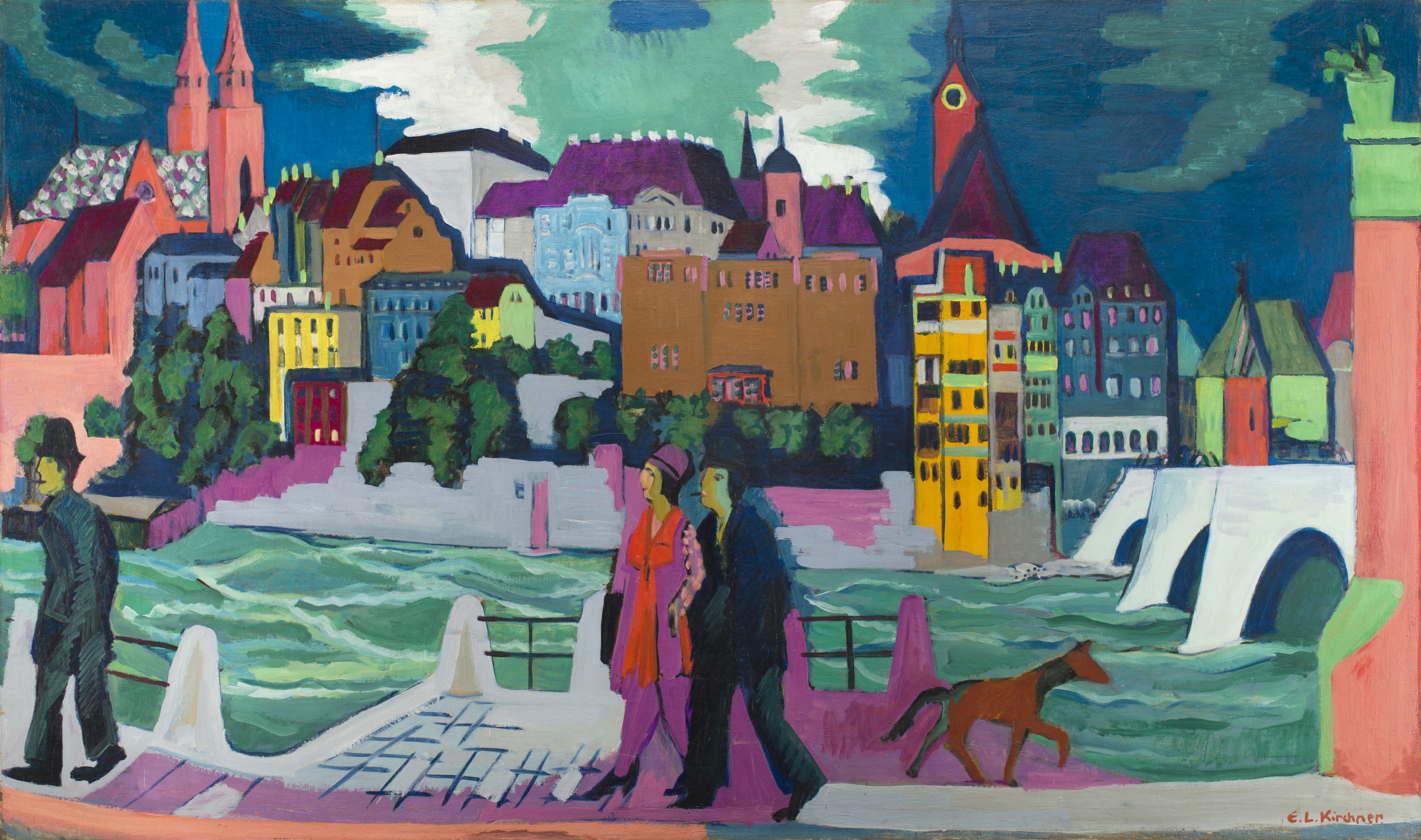
View of Basel and
the Rhine, 1927-28, Saint Louis Art Museum

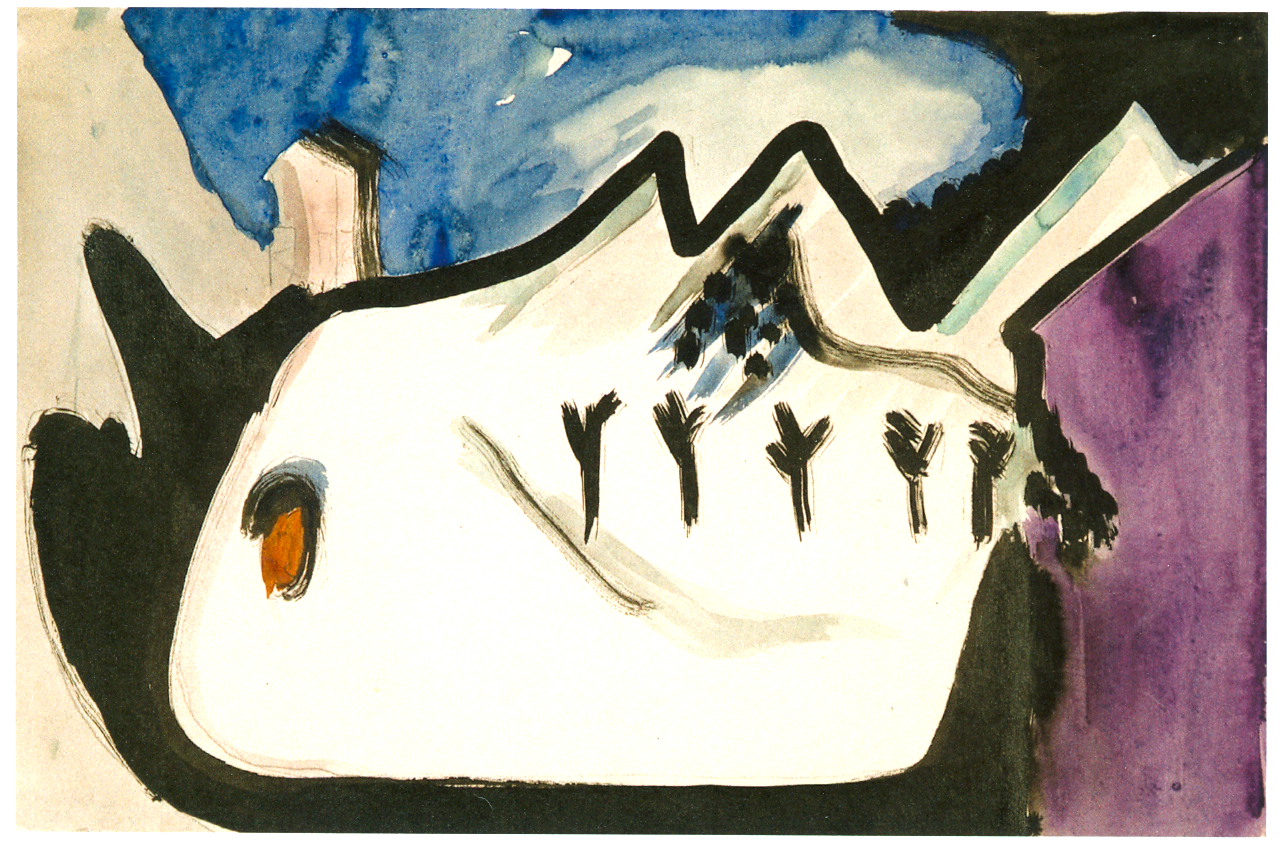
Snowy landscape, 1930

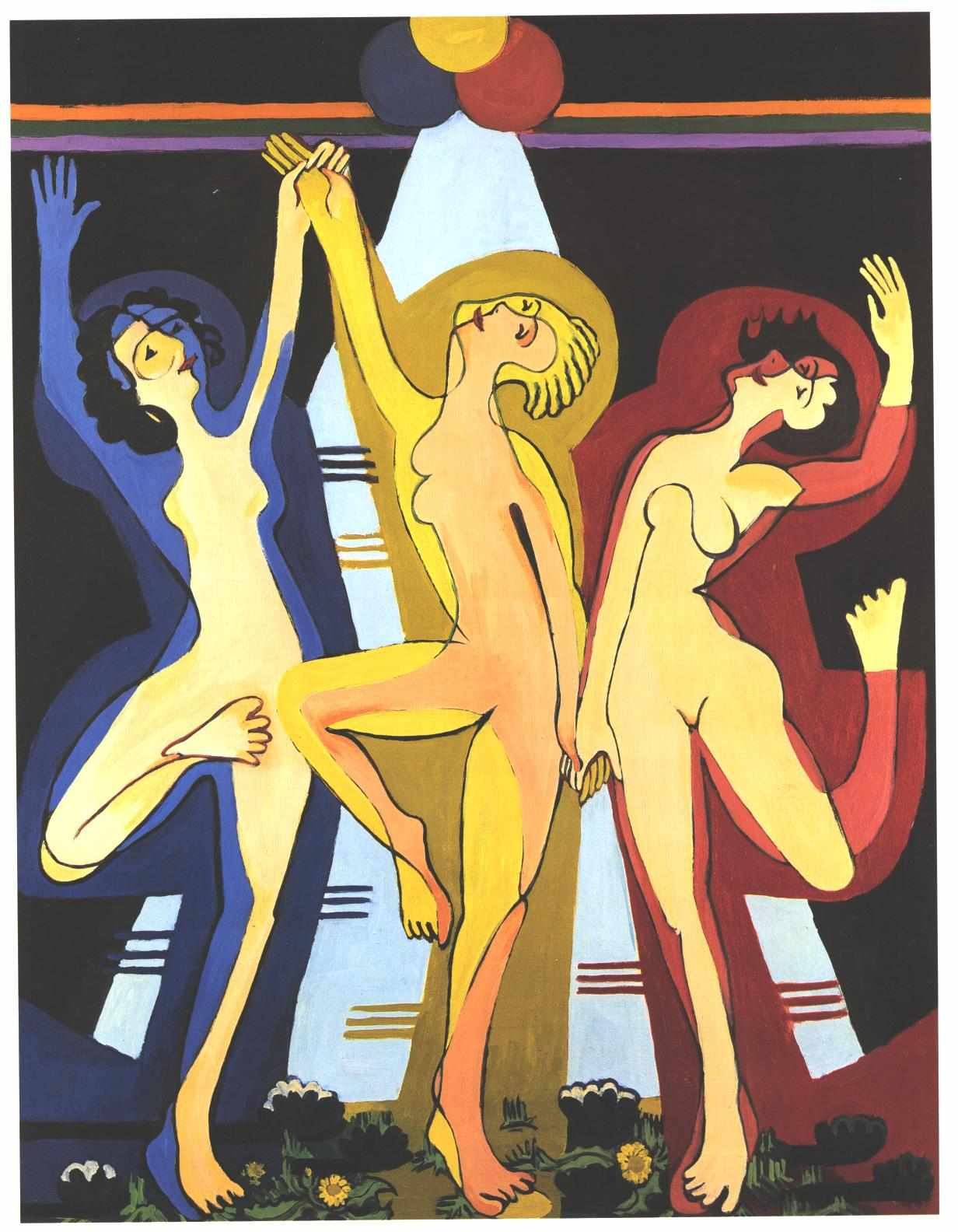
Colorful Dance, 1932

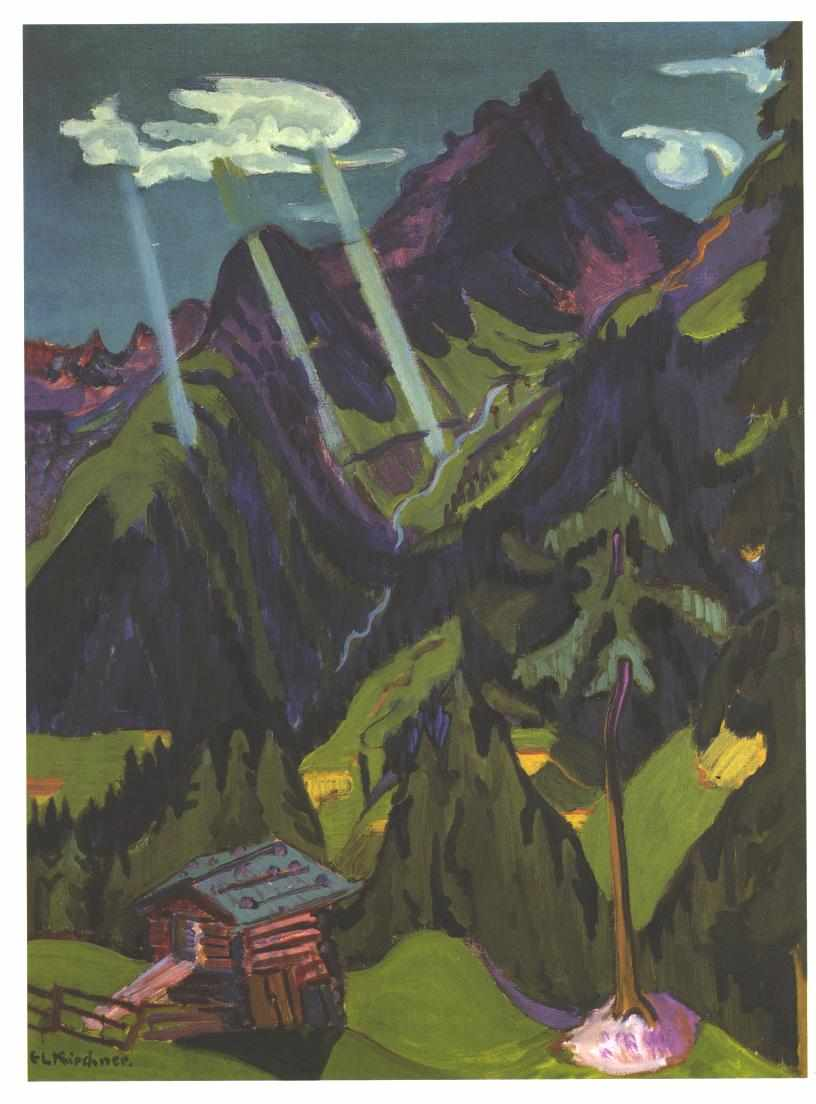
Landscape in Graubünden with Sun Rays, 1937

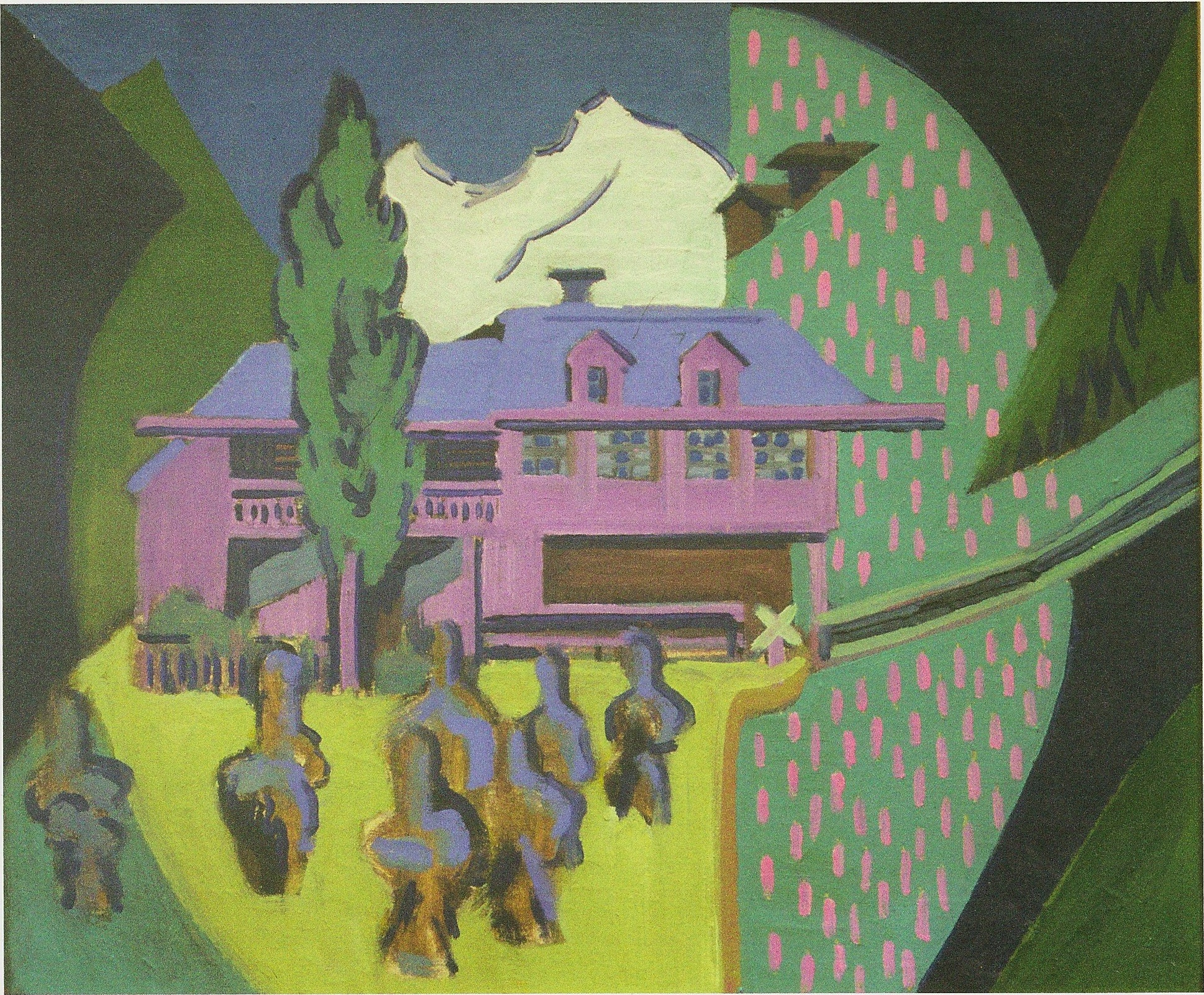
Violett House in Front of a Snowy Mountain, 1938

=== Publications ===
- Krämer, Felix. Kirchner, Hatje Cantz, 2010. ISBN 978-3-7757-2553-8
- Wye, Deborah. Kirchner and the Berlin Street, The Museum of Modern Art, New York, 2008. ISBN 978-0-87070-741-4
- Kort, Pamela. Ernst Ludwig Kirchner: Berlin Street Scene, Neue Galerie New York, 2008. ISBN 978-1-931794-15-2
- Ernst Ludwig Kirchner: Imaginary Travels Prestel, 2018
- Spira, Freyda, 2024. Munch and Kirchner: Anxiety and Expression. New Haven: Yale University Press. ISBN 978-0-300-27585-8
