= Feininger =

Feininger is a German surname. Notable people with the surname include:

- Julia Feininger (1880–1970), German-American artist and art patron, husband of Lyonel
- Karl Feininger (1844–1922), German-American musician
  - Lyonel Feininger (1871–1956), German-American painter, caricaturist, and comic strip artist, son of Karl
    - Andreas Feininger (1906–1999), French-born, American photographer, son of Lyonel
    - T. Lux Feininger (1910–2011), German-born, American painter, son of Lyonel

== See also ==
- 6653 Feininger, main-belt asteroid
- Museum Lyonel Feininger
