= Lyonel Feininger (Hess book) =

1961 book by Hans Hess

- Language: German
- Subject: Lyonel Feininger
- Genre: Art history
- Publisher: Kohlhammer Verlag
- Publication date: 1959
- Pages: 354/355
- ISBN: 3170115693

Lyonel Feininger is a 1959 book by Hans Hess. Centered exclusively on the titular artist's oil paintings, it features an illustrated catalogue and some correspondence associated with Feininger, as well as an exhibition list and bibliography. It was praised for its uniqueness and accessibility, but criticized for its bias and unresolved themes.

== Contents ==
Lyonel Feininger is a monograph on the titular artist. It features a catalogue compiled by his wife Julia, illustrated by slide-sized depictions of his work; only oil paintings are depicted in the catalogue, in contrast to Feininger's diverse repertoire. Pieces of heretofore-unpublished correspondence sent from Feininger to his wife are featured in the book, as is a list of exhibitions and a bibliography. Lynton and Neumeyer found the types of contents in the book in line with similar books.

The book addresses Feininger's involvement in the Bauhaus movement, with Lynton remarking that it does so in a relatively abridged manner. Neumeyer added that there were unresolved aspects on Feininger's work, specifically the psychological meaning of the grotesque and the influence of Cubism pioneer Robert Delaunay despite a supposed enmity between them.

The American edition has 355 pages and the British edition has 354 numbered pages. There are 540 illustrations, thirty of which are in colour."

== Background, production, and release ==
Hans Hess was a German art historian based in the United Kingdom. Lyonel Feininger and his wife Julia were both friends of the Hess family, being among the artists who lived at the Hess villa.

Feininger's wife Julia assisted Hess in writing the book, compiling the catalogue and providing the correspondence. In addition to Hess' authorship and Feininger's involvement, Annemarie Heynig and Bernard Karpel contributed with the bibliographical listings. The book's illustrations were printed in West Germany, a decision Neumeyer equated to "lower prices on a higher level of execution."

The book's original edition was released by Kohlhammer Verlag in 1959. An American edition of the book was released in 1961 from Harry N. Abrams, Inc.. Another edition was released in the United Kingdom by Thames & Hudson. It sold for $20 in the United States and £7 75 in the United Kingdom. According to Lynton, this was the first full-scale monograph on Feininger.

== Reception ==
Lynton praised the book for both its simple text and admiration of Feininger. Neumeyer praised it for its research, accessibility, and image quality, but said that it had "a certain monotony of alignment, in which the many excellent formulations are occasionally drowned". Lynton said that the book's existence helped the subject become distinct from his Expressionist contemporaries, and Neumeyer described it as a 20th-century equivalent of Gustave Doré's illustrations for La Grande Bible de Tours.

Lynton criticized the book for allowing Hess' admiration towards Feininger to overshadow the book, as well as understating the Bauhaus' role in Feininger's life. Neumeyer said he was concerned about the shifting of the book's selectivity towards the reader at the expense of specialty, feeling that this could have been avoided by following Werner Haftmann or Herbert Read. In a review of the 1972 book Lyonel Feininger: A Definitive Catalogue of His Graphic Work, Henning Bock said that the book "fail[ed] to note [the] real significance" of Feininger's graphic works, devoting only one paragraph on that aspect of his career.
