= Andreas Feininger =

American photographer and writer (1906–1999)

The Photojournalist, showing the photojournalist Dennis Stock, may be Feininger's best-known photograph; he took it for Life in 1951.

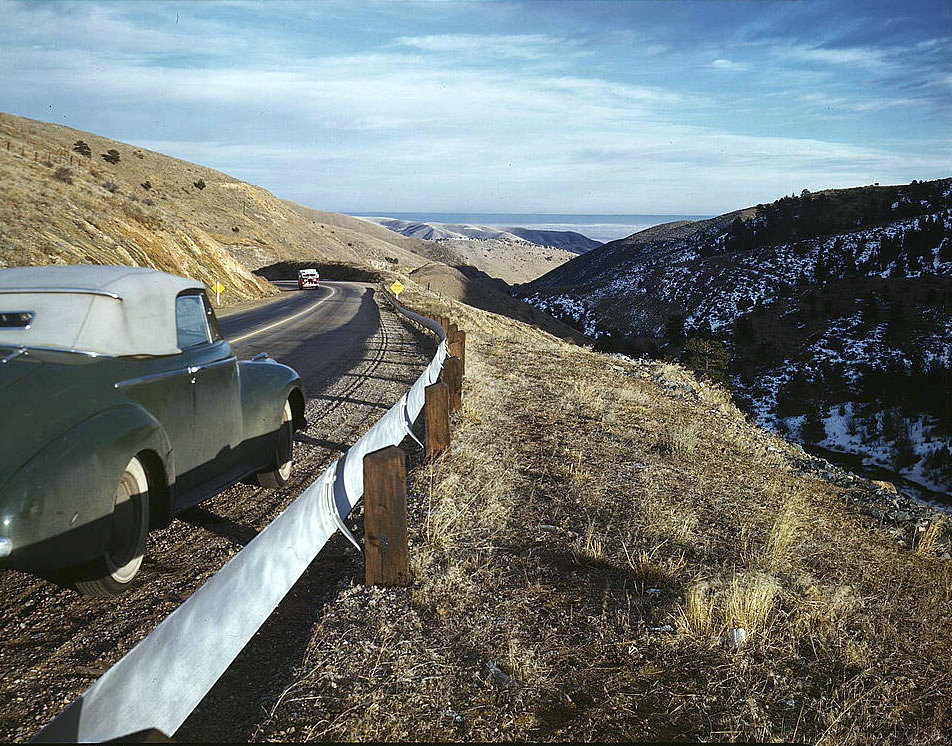
View along US 40 in Mount Vernon Canyon, Colorado, 1942, a photograph taken when Feininger was an employee of the Office of War Information (OWI)

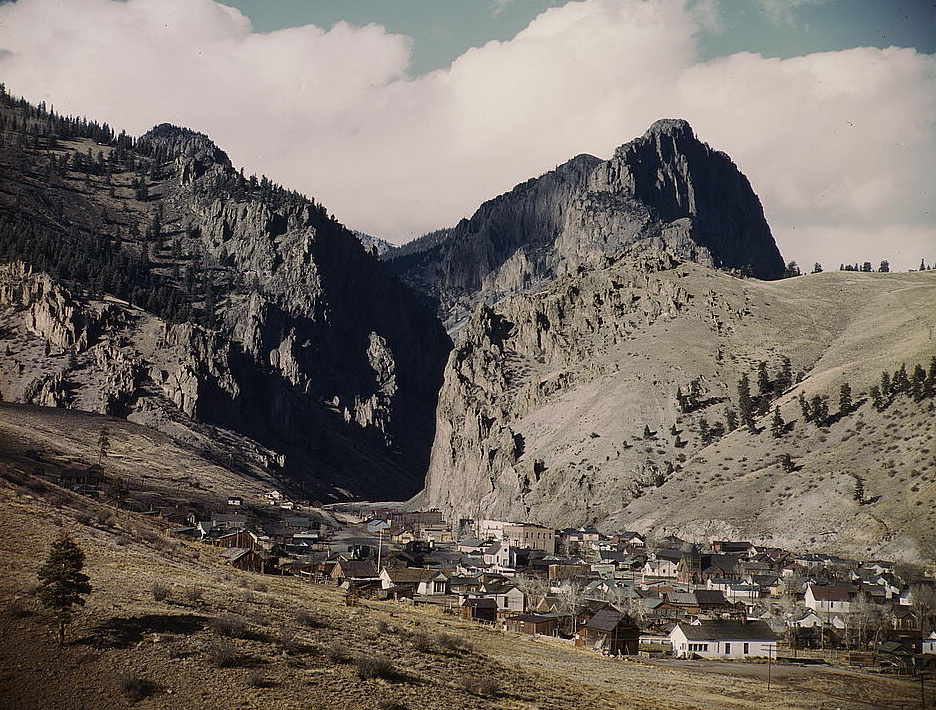
Creede, Colorado in 1942, another OWI photograph by Feininger

Andreas Bernhard Lyonel Feininger (December 27, 1906 – February 18, 1999) was an American photographer and a writer on photographic technique. He was noted for his dynamic black-and-white scenes of Manhattan and for studies of the structures of natural objects.

== Biography ==
Feininger was born in Paris, France, the eldest son of German Jewish artist Julia Feininger (née Lilienfeld) and the American painter and art educator Lyonel Feininger (1871-1956). His paternal grandparents were the German violinist Karl Feininger (1844-1922) and the American singer Elizabeth Feininger (née Lutz), who was also of German descent. His younger brother was the painter and photographer T. Lux Feininger (1910-2011).

In 1908 the Feininger family moved to Berlin, and in 1919 to Weimar, where Lyonel Feininger took up the post of Master of the Printing Workshop at the newly formed Bauhaus art school.

Andreas left school at 16, in 1922, to study at the Bauhaus; he graduated as a cabinetmaker in April 1925. Afterwards he studied architecture, initially at the Staatliche Bauschule Weimar (State Architectural College, Weimar) and later at the Staatliche Bauschule Zerbst. (Zerbst is a city in the German state of Saxony-Anhalt, about 20 km from Dessau, where the Bauhaus moved to in 1926.) The Feininger family moved to Dessau with the Bauhaus. In addition to continuing his architectural studies in Zerbst, Andreas developed an interest in photography and was given guidance by neighbour and Bauhaus teacher László Moholy-Nagy.

In 1936, he gave up architecture and moved to Sweden, where he focused on photography. In advance of World War II, in 1939, Feininger immigrated to the U.S., where he established himself as a freelance photographer. In 1943, he joined the staff of Life magazine, an association that lasted until 1962.

Feininger became famous for his photographs of New York. Other frequent subjects among his works were science and nature, as seen in bones, shells, plants, and minerals in the images of which he often stressed their structure. Rarely did he photograph people or make portraits.

Feininger wrote comprehensive manuals about photography, of which the best known is The Complete Photographer. In the introduction to one of Feininger's books of photographs, Ralph Hattersley, the editor of the photography journal Infinity, described him as "one of the great architects who helped create photography as we know it today." In 1966, the American Society of Media Photographers (ASMP) awarded Feininger its highest distinction, the Robert Leavitt Award. In 1991, the International Center of Photography awarded Feininger the Infinity Lifetime Achievement Award.

Today, Feininger's photographs are in the permanent collections of the Center for Creative Photography at the University of Arizona, the J. Paul Getty Museum, the International Center of Photography, the Museum of Modern Art, the Metropolitan Museum of Art, the National Gallery of Art, Whitney Museum of American Art, London's Victoria and Albert Museum, and the George Eastman Museum in Rochester, New York, among others.

Feininger’s work has been exhibited at the Museu Fundación Juan March, Palma (Andreas Feininger (1906-1999), 16 January - 3 May 2008, traveled to Museo de Arte Abstracto Español, Cuenca (23 May - 31 August 2008)); Zeppelin Museum (Andreas Feininger. That's Photography, 24 September 2010 - 9 January 2011, and Andreas Feininger. Industrial photography in America, 23 November 2012 - 24 February 2013); the Santa Barbara Museum of Art (Lyonel Feininger/Andreas Feininger: The Modern Sea, The Modern City, 29 January - 18 June 2023); and the Bröhan Museum (Andreas Feininger. New York In The Forties, 3 March - 30 July 2023).

== Bibliography ==
=== Educational books on photography ===
- Menschen vor der Kamera. Ein Lehrbuch moderner Bildnisfotografie. Halle: Dr. Walther Heering Verlag, 1934. About portrait photography.
- Vergrössern leicht gemacht. Harzburg: Dr. Walther Heering Verlag, 1935.
- Selbst Entwickeln und Kopieren. Harzburg: Dr. Walther Heering Verlag, 1935.
- Aufnahme-Technik. Die Harzburg-Reihe, 13. Harzburg: Dr. Walther Heering Verlag, 1936.
- Entwickeln, Kopieren, Vergrössern. Harzburg: Dr. Walther Heering Verlag, 1936.
- Fotografische Gestaltung. Harzburg: Dr. Walther Heering Verlag, 1937.
- Hyresgästernas sparkasse- och byggnadsförening. Stockholm: Hyresgästernas Förlags A.-B., 1937. About HSB; in Swedish.
- Motive im Gegenlicht. Harzburg: Dr. Walther Heering Verlag, 1939.
- Exakta – Ein Weg zu Foto-Neuland. Halle: Isert, 1939. On the Exakta camera.
  - Les Horizons nouveaux de la photographie avec l'Exakta. Halle: Isert, 1940. French translation.
- New Paths in Photography. Boston, American Photographic Pub. Co., 1939. London: Chapman & Hall, 1939.
- The Twin-Lens Camera Companion. London: Focal Press, 1948. By Henry Swinsbury, with a contribution by Feininger. On twin-lens reflex cameras.
- Feininger on Photography. Chicago: Ziff-Davis, 1949. New York: Crown, 1953.
- Advanced Photography, Methods and Conclusions. New York: Prentice-Hall, 1952.
- Successful Photography. New York: Prentice-Hall, 1954. And later editions.
  - Das Buch der Fotografie. Frankfurt: Büchergilde Gutenberg, 1961. German translation.
  - Framgångsrik fotografering. Stockholm: Bonnier, 1958. Swedish translation.
  - Hyvä valokuvaaja. Helsinki: Tammi, 1957. Finnish translation.
  - Il libro della fotografia: Tecnica e applicazioni. Milan: Garzanti, 1961. Italian translation. Also later editions.
- Successful Color Photography. New York: Prentice-Hall, 1954. And later editions.
  - Das Buch der Farbfotografie. Düsseldorf: Econ, 1961. German translation.
  - Värivalokuvaaja. Helsinki: Tammi, 1958. Finnish translation.
  - Il libro della fotografia a colori. Milan: Garzanti, 1962. Italian translation. Also later editions.
- The Creative Photographer. Englewood Cliffs, NJ: Prentice-Hall, 1955. And later editions.
  - Der Schlüssel zur Fotografie von Heute. Düsseldorf: Econ, 1958. German translation.
  - Skapande fotografering. Stockholm: Bonnier, 1958. Swedish translation.
  - Fotograful creator. Bucharest: Editura Meridiane, 1967. Romanian translation.
- Total Picture Control: A Personal Approach to Photography. New York: Crown, 1961. New York: Amphoto, 1970.
- Die hohe Schule der Fotografie. Düsseldorf: Econ, 1961. And later editions.
  - Andreas Feiningers fotoskole. Copenhagen: Grafisk Forlag, 1962. Danish translation.
  - De hogere school der fotografie. Amsterdam: De Bussey, 1963. Dutch translation.
  - Vysoká škola fotografie. Prague: Orbis, 1968. Czech translation.
  - A Manual of Advanced Photography. London: Thames & Hudson, 1962. Revised edition, London: Thames & Hudson, 1970.
- Voir: Précis sur la technique et l'art d'exceller en photographie. Lausanne: Edita, 1961.
- Arte y técnica en fotografía: Cómo perfeccionar sus fotos. Madrid: Mediterráneo, 1968.
- Cómo hacer buenas fotografías: Un curso completo sobre la mecánica, la técnica y las aplicaciones de la fotografía. Madrid: Mediterráneo, 1968. Madrid: Mediterráneo, 1980. ISBN 8471561158.
- The Complete Photographer. Englewood Cliffs, NJ: Prentice-Hall, 1965. London: Thames & Hudson, 1965. And later editions.
- Die neue Foto-Lehre. Düsseldorf: Econ, 1965.
  - La nuova tecnica della fotografia. Milan: Garzanti, 1966. Italian translation.
- Fotograferen van A–Z: Een nieuw handboek der fotografie. Amsterdam: De Bussy, 1965.
- Basic Color Photography. 1969.
- The Color Photo Book. Englewood Cliffs, NJ: Prentice-Hall, 1969.
  - Kleurenfotografie van A–Z. Amsterdam: De Bussy, 1969. Dutch translation.
- The Complete Colour Photographer. Thames & Hudson, 1969.
- Farbfotolehre. Neu bearbeitete Ausgabe des berühmten Standardwerkes. Munich: Heyne, 1969. ISBN 3453411609.
- Photographic Seeing. 1973.
- Principles of Composition. 1973.
- Darkroom Techniques. 1974.
- The Perfect Photograph. 1974.
- Roots of Art. 1974.
- Light and Lighting in Photography. 1976.

=== Other pictorial books ===
- Stockholm. Stockholm: A. Bonnier, 1936. In Swedish and English.
- Hedenhös och medeltid. Forna dagars Sverige. Copenhagen, 1941. By Feininger and Gustaf Näsström.
- Vasatid och karolinsk tid. Forna dagars Sverige. Copenhagen, 1941. By Feininger and Gustaf Näsström.
- Frihetstid och Gustaviansk tid. Forna dagars Sverige. Copenhagen, 1941. By Feininger and Gustaf Näsström.
- New York. Chicago: Ziff-Davis, 1945. Introduction by John Erskine, text by Jacquelyn Judge.
- The Face of New York: The City as It Was and as It Is. New York: Crown, 1954. Text by Susan E. Lyman.
- Changing America: The Land as It Was and How Man Has Changed It. New York: Crown, 1955. Text by Patricia Dyett.
- The Anatomy of Nature: How Function Shapes the Form and Design of Animate and Inanimate Structures throughout the Universe. New York: Crown, 1956. London: Thomas Yoseloff, 1956. New York: Dover, 1979.
  - Vorm en functie in de natuur: 170 foto's. Delft: W. Gaade, 1956. Dutch translation.
  - Das Antlitz der Natur. Munich: Knaur, 1957. Zurich: Buchclub Ex Libris, 1957. German translation.
  - Anatomía de la naturaleza: De cómo la función crea la forma en las estructuras animadas e inanimadas de entero universo. Barcelona: Jano, 1962. Spanish translation.
- Frauen und Göttinnen von der Steinzeit bis zu Picasso. Cologne: M. DuMont Schauberg, 1960. Text by J. Bon.
  - Maids, Madonnas, and Witches: Women in Sculpture from Prehistoric Times to Picasso. New York: Abrams, 1961. English translation. Introduction by Henry Miller.
  - The Image of Woman: Women in Sculpture from Pre-historic Times to the Present Day. London: Thames & Hudson, 1961. English translation. Introduction by Henry Miller.
- Andreas Feininger fotografiert Steine. Düsseldorf: Econ, 1960. About architecture; with an introduction by Kasimir Edschmid.
  - Man and Stone: A Journey into the Past. New York: Crown, 1961. English translation.
  - Andreas Feininger fotografeert steen. Haarlem: Gottmer, 1962. Dutch translation.
  - Stone and Man: A Photographic Exploration. New York: Dover, 1979.
- New York. New York: Crown, 1964; New York: Viking, 1964. London: Thames & Hudson, 1964. Text by Kate Simon.
  - New York. Düsseldorf: Econ, 1964. German translation.
- Lyonel Feininger: City at the Edge of the World. New York: Praeger, 1965. Text by T. Lux Feininger.
  - Lyonel Feininger. Die Stadt am Ende der Welt. Munich: Rütten & Loening, 1965. German translation.
- Forms of Nature and Life. New York: Viking Press, 1966.
  - Die Sprache der Natur. Düsseldorf: Econ, 1966. German translation.
- Form in Nature and Life. London: Thames & Hudson, 1966.
- Trees. New York: Viking Press, 1968. London: Thames & Hudson, 1968. Harmondsworth, Middx: Penguin, 1978. ISBN 0-14-004747-6. New York: Viking Press, 1978. ISBN 0670729434. New York: Rizzoli, 1991. ISBN 0847813258.
  - Wunderbare Welt der Bäume und Wälder. Vienna: Econ, 1968. German translation.
- Lyonel Feininger. New York: Marlborough-Gerson Gallery, 1969. Text by Peter Selz.
- Shells. 1972.
- Feininger's Hamburg. 1980.
- Feininger's Chicago. 1981.
- Industrial America. 1981.
- Leaves. New York. 1984.
- In a Grain of Sand: Exploring Design by Nature. San Francisco: Sierra Club, 1986.
- Nature in Miniature. London: Thames & Hudson, 1989.
- Stockholm 1933–1939. Stockholm: Stockholms Stadsmuseum, 1991. ISBN 9185238708.

=== Monographs ===
- Die Welt neu gesehen. Ein Querschnitt meiner Arbeit. Vienna: Econ, 1963.
  - The World Through My Eyes: 30 Years of Photography. New York: Crown, 1963. English translation.
  - The World Through My Eyes. London: Thames & Hudson, 1964. English translation.
  - Regards sur le monde: 30 années d'art photographique. Brussels: Meddens 1964. French translation.
  - Il mondo come io lo vedo. Milan: Garzanti, 1964. Italian translation.
  - Met andere ogen gezien. Amsterdam: De Bussy, 1964. Dutch translation.
- Andreas Feininger. 1973. Text by Ralph Hattersley.
- Andreas Feininger, That's Photography. Ostfildern: Hatje Cantz, 2004. ISBN 3-7757-1429-4. 320 pages, 210 photographs, texts.
- Andreas Feininger. A Photographer's Life. 1906–1999. Ostfildern: Hatje Cantz, 2010. ISBN 978-3-7757-2704-4. 192 pages, 129 photographs, text.
