= Sabine Moritz =

German painter (born 1969)

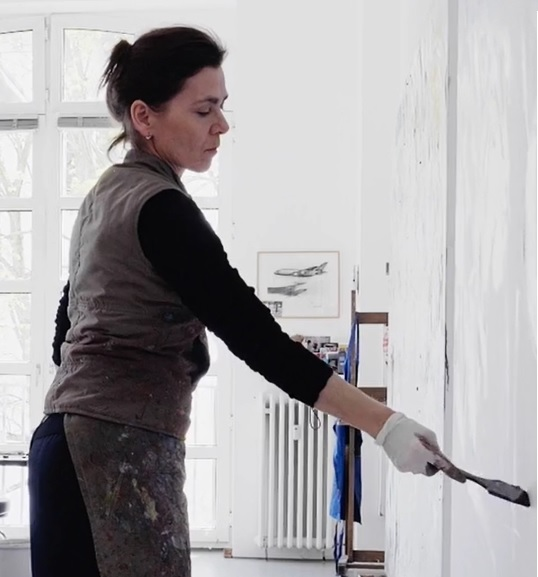
Sabine Moritz in her studio 2023

Sabine Moritz (born 1969 in Quedlinburg) is a German painter.

== Life and work ==
Sabine Moritz was born as the daughter of a chemist in East Germany. From 1973 to 1981 she lived together with her family in a high-density housing area of Lobeda in Neulobeda. Before emigrating to West Germany in 1985, she lived in Jena for 4 years. In 1988 she started her studies at the Hochschule für Gestaltung Offenbach (The Offenbach University of Art and Design) at the class of Adam Jankowski. From 1991 she continued her studies at the Kunstakademie Düsseldorf (Academy of Art Düsseldorf). At first she was in the class of Markus Lüpertz but changed to Gerhard Richter’s in the following year. She was the last student to be accepted to his class as he had planned to lay his teaching career to rest in 1994.

In the years 1991 and 1992 she created the series of drawings Lobeda that consists of more than 100 pencil drawings. The subjects of these drawings are the living environments of a prefabricated housing estate in Neulobeda, East Germany, where Moritz lived as a child from 1973 to 1981. In 2009, they were discovered in the artist's studio by the curator Hans Ulrich Obrist and the publisher Walther König and subsequently published in 2010 by Buchhandlung Walther König. These works were shown in the Kunsthaus Sans Titre in Potsdam from August to September in 2011. Later that year the book Jena, Düsseldorf was published, again by Walther König. It contains works that Sabine made between 1992 and 1994 after beginning her training at the Düsseldorf Art Academy. Neulobeda and the motifs from the Lobeda series remain the subjects of these works.

Sabine Moritz has been married to her former teacher, Gerhard Richter, since 1995. They have three children and live in Cologne.

== Sabine Moritz as a model ==
Gerhard Richter has used his wife as a model in many of his paintings. Two paintings – Reader (CR: 799-1 and 804) and Small Bather (CR: 815-1) from 1994 – depict her, although she remains anonymous through the non-descriptive titles. Both these paintings were made from a photographic original just as Richter has created throughout his artistic career. They also both allude to famous paintings: Reader draws influences from Jan Vermeer's Woman in Blue Reading a Letter (1663/64) and Jean-Honoré Fragonard's A Young Girl Reading (c. 1776). The Small Bather theme has an iconic predecessor in Jean-Auguste-Dominique Ingres’ painting with the same title.

In 1995 Richter painted a series, which depicts his wife with their eldest son Moritz as an infant known under the title S. with Child (CR: 827-1 to 827-8). These works can closely be associated with the Madonna with Child topos.

Richter's portrait of his wife's Head (sketch) was sold at auction for US$2,33 million by Christie's in 2010.

== Exhibitions (excerpt) ==
- since 2023: On Display. Neue Werke der Sammlung, K21, Kunstsammlung Nordrhein-Westfalen, Düsseldorf
- 2023: Let the sunshine in (group exhibition), Pilar Corrias Gallery, London; Under the Skin & Heart of Drought, Pilar Corrias Gallery, London; August, Gagosian Gallery, Roma
- 2022: Lobeda oder die Rekonstruktion einer Welt, Museum Lyonel Feininger, Quedlinburg; Sabine Moritz, Marian Goodman Gallery, New York; Raging Moon, Hyundai Gallery, Seoul
- 2021: Mercy, Pilar Corrias Gallery, London
- 2020: Passages (group exhibition with Robert Adams), Galerie Thomas Zander, Köln; Lagune, Galerie Felix Ringel, Düsseldorf; Journal Entries, Heni Publishing, London
- 2019: deeply unaware, Galerie Marian Goodman, Paris; Sterne und Granit, Kunsthalle Rostock, Rostock
- 2018: Paintings and Drawings, Pilar Corrias Gallery, London; Eden, König Galerie, Berlin
- 2017: Age of Terror (group exhibition), Imperial War Museum, London; Neuland, Kunsthalle Bremerhaven, Bremerhaven
- 2016: Blumen, Masken, Schädel, Galerie Haas AG, Zürich; Dawn, Galerie Marian Goodman, Paris
- 2015: Helicopter (book launch), Heni Publishing, London; Sea King (book launch), Serpentine Gallery, London; Schiffe und Wasser, Felix Ringel Galerie, Düsseldorf; Harvest, Pilar Corrias Gallery, London
- 2014: Home, Pilar Corrias Gallery, London; Bilder und Zeichnungen 1991-2013, Von der Heydt Kunsthalle, Wuppertal-Barmen
- 2013: Limbo 2013, Galerie Marian Goodman, Paris; Freie Sicht / Adam Jankowski und Künstler aus seiner Malereiklasse an der HfG Offenbach (group exhibition), Nassauischer Kunstverein, Wiesbaden; Concrete and Dust, Foundation de 11 Lijnen, Oudenburg, Belgien
- 2012: Internationaler Faber-Castell Preis für Zeichnung 2012 (group exhibition), Neues Museum – Staatl. Museum für Kunst und Design, Nürnberg; Bilder, Felix Ringel Galerie, Düsseldorf; Jena-Düsseldorf, artroom goldensquare, London
- 2011: Lobeda, Kunsthaus sans titre, Potsdam; Jena-Düsseldorf (book launch), Buchhandlung Walther König, Köln; Lilies and Objects, artroom goldensquare, London
- 2010: Lobeda (book launch), Buchhandlung Walther König, Berlin / Köln; The Good, The Bad & the Ugly (group exhibition), Cultuurcentrum Mechelen, Mechelen, Belgien
- 2006: Limbo. Paintings from 2005, Andrew Mummery Gallery, London

== Literature ==
- Sabine Moritz. Lobeda oder die Rekonstruktion einer Welt, hg. v. Christian Philipsen und Gloria Köpnick, Imhof: Petersberg 2022, ISBN 978-3-7319-1270-5.
- Raging Moon, Gallery Hyundai, Seoul 2022, ISBN 978-89-6736-108-2.
- Jena Düsseldorf (reprint), Verlag der Buchhandlung Walther König / Heni Publishing, Cologne/London 2021, ISBN 978-3-86335-033-8.
- Lobeda. (expanded edition), Verlag der Buchhandlung Walther König / Heni Publishing, Cologne/London 2021, ISBN 978-1-912122-46-2.
- Journal Entries, Heni Publishing, London, 2020, ISBN 978-1-912122-37-0.
- deeply unaware, Marian Goodman Galerie, Paris, Verlag der Buchhandlung Walther König, Cologne 2019, ISBN 978-0-944219-45-4.
- Neuland, Kunsthalle, Bremerhaven, Verlag der Buchhandlung Walther König, Cologne 2017, ISBN 978-3-96098-215-9.
- Dawn / Storm, Marian Goodman Galerie, Paris, Verlag der Buchhandlung Walther König, Cologne 2016, ISBN 978-3-96098-038-4.
- Erinnerungen / Memoirs, Verlag der Buchhandlung Walther König, Cologne 2016, ISBN 978-3-86335-899-0.
- Blumen, Masken, Schädel, Galerie Haas AG, Zürich 2016.
- Schiffe und Wasser, Felix Ringel Galerie, Düsseldorf 2015, ISBN 978-3-00-049828-2.
- Sea King, Heni Publishing, London 2015, ISBN 978-0-9930103-0-9.
- Helicopter. Heni Publishing, London 2014, ISBN 978-0-9930103-0-9.
- Lobeda-Ost 1981 (Edition of 100), Nieves, Zürich 2014.
- Bilder und Zeichnungen 1991–2013, Verlag der Buchhandlung Walther König, Cologne 2014, ISBN 978-3-86335-531-9.
- Concrete and Dust, Foundation de 11 Lijnen, Oudenberg (Belgien), 2014, ISBN 978-90-79881-28-4.
- Limbo 2013. Marian Goodman Gallery, New York (Paris) 2013, ISBN 978-0-944219-21-8.
- Faber Castell International Drawing Award 2012, Verlag für Moderne Kunst, Nuremberg 2012, ISBN 978-3-86984-365-0.
- Lilies and Objects. Heni Publishing, London 2011, ISBN 978-0-9564041-6-9.
- Jena Düsseldorf. Verlag der Buchhandlung Walther König, Cologne 2011, ISBN 978-3-86335-033-8.
- Lobeda. Verlag der Buchhandlung Walther König, Cologne 2010, ISBN 978-3-86560-734-8.
- Roses. Heni Publishing, London 2010, ISBN 978-0-9564041-2-1.
- Limbo: Paintings from 2005. Andrew Mummery Gallery, London 2006.
