= Prasse =

Prasse is a surname. Notable people with the surname include:

- Erv Prasse (1917–2005), American multi-sport athlete
- Karl-Gottfried Prasse, Danish linguist
- Leona E. Prasse (1897–1984), American curator and art collector
