= Karl Schenker =

Austrian photographer, illustrator and draughtsman

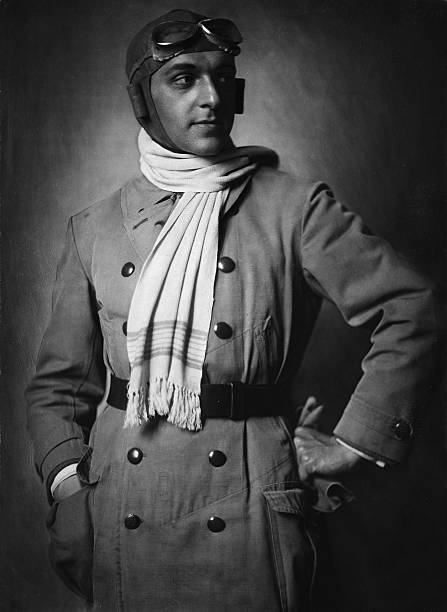
Karl Schenker in aviator outfit - 1919. Photographer: Hermann Schieberth

Karl Schenker (born Karol Schenker on 23 October 1886 in Sereth, Bukovina, Austro-Hungarian Empire; died 18 August 1954 in London) was an Austrian photographer, illustrator of fashion magazines and painter. The artist, who mainly worked in Berlin, was Jewish and had to emigrate from Germany to London in 1938 and received British citizenship in 1948.

Karol Schenker was born on 23 October 1886 in Sereth (now Siret in Romania) the son of tax inspector Jakob Schenker and Rosa Schenker (née Schleisberg). After the family moved to Lemberg (in the Austro-Hungarian part of the former Poland, now Ukraine), Schenker became a member of the Friends of Artistic Photography around 1900 and has regularly participated in the association's exhibitions from 1904. Karol Schenker exhibited his work at the International General Photography Exhibition for Amateur Photography in Kraków at the age of 18. In the amateur photography category, he was awarded a silver medal.

== Early career ==
It is believed that Schenker studied at the Technical University of Lemberg. Together with photographer Eduard Wasow he ran a photo studio in Munich for a few months in 1910 before moving to Berlin in 1911 and opening his own studio at Kurfürstendamm 29. Karl Schenker also worked for Ullstein-Verlag, which regularly published photographs by him in its magazine "Die Dame". Around the same time, he was taking numerous portrait photographs for private individuals and artists. Karl Schenker regularly took part in national and international photography exhibitions, including the London Salon of Photography in 1913 and the Cologne Werkbund exhibition in 1914. In 1913, the Vienna-based photographers Madame d'Ora and Arthur Benda worked in his studio, with whom he visited Vienna in 1916. In the same year he started teaching in his studio and in the Berlin's Lette-Verein. His students included the Dutch photographer Richard Polak and Toni Arens-Tepe.

On 16 March 1915 he married the Russian chemist Olga Labenskaja, whom he frequently portrayed in the following years. The couple went their separate ways after a few years.

== Post-WW1 Career ==
Karl Schenker was one of the founding members of the Gesellschaft Deutscher Lichtbildner (GDL), founded in 1919. At this time his studio was located at Matthäikirchstraße 27 in Berlin W1. For the Ufa films Bismarck and Fridericius Rex, he made accompanying photo portfolios with portraits. In 1920 Schenker moved to a more comfortable studio at Kurfürstendamm 6 (which was renamed the Budapester Straße in 1925). His old studio was taken over by the painter Jeanne Mammen, who lived and worked here until the end of her life.

At the beginning of the 1920s, Schenker took part in many renowned photography exhibitions, including the annual exhibitions of the Gesellschaft Deutscher Lichtbildner, the Berliner Photographie exhibition and the Deutsche Gewerbeschau in Munich. During this time he also portrayed Leni Riefenstahl, who was teaching at the Kurfürstendamm in the Helene Grimm-Reiter dance school. The portrait appeared on the front page of the magazine "Uhu" on 1 October 1924. From 1922 to 1924, Eleonore Feininger, the daughter of Lyonel Feininger and Clara Fürst, worked as a student at Schenker's studio.

One of his avant-garde activities was the creation of wax mannequins which he would then photograph. Using wigs, false eyelashes. and his skills as a painter, Schenker elevated the art of the store dummy to new levels of refinement and verisimilitude. Some of these images ended up in "Die Dame" and have become a subject of interest in exhibitions, including the Venice Biennale.

In 1923, Schenker met the Viennese Lilli Behrend, whom he married a short time later. During these years, Schenker concentrated on portrait and fashion photography. In 1925 the couple moved to New York and the photographer Mario von Bucovich took over Schenker's photo studio in Berlin. In America Karl Schenker mainly worked as a painter and draftsman reverting to his birth name Karol Schenker. At an exhibition dedicated to him in the Gainsborough Galleries, he showed a picture cycle that included portraits of Enrico Caruso, Giacomo Puccini and Gerhart Hauptmann, among others.

== Return and Exile ==
In November 1930 the family returned to live in Berlin, with his studio at Aschaffenburger Straße 9 from 1931 to 1934. Schenker resumed work for the Ullstein publishing house. In addition to fashion photographs for the magazine "Die Dame", he also published again in the monthly magazine "Uhu". In addition, he was booked by department stores, including the Nathan Israel store and fashion journals, to create catalog and advertising shots. In 1932 he met Ruth Elisabeth Engel, who then worked as an employee in his studio.

After the seizure of power by the Nazi Party, the Ullstein publishing house was "aryanized" and the magazine "Uhu" was discontinued in 1933. It was becoming increasingly difficult for Karl Schenker to make a living in Berlin. In the meantime, widowed, he had to travel to London to be able to marry Ruth Engel on 10 December 1936, as this was no longer possible in Germany for those classified as Jewish. On 15 February 1938 Karl Schenker was expelled from the German Reich for "improper conduct in public (road) traffic". The family emigrated to London, where he opened a photo studio on Regent Street for fashion, portrait and colour photography, retouching, drawing and advertising in 1938. Inge Ader worked as a trainee in his studio. His customers also included numerous celebrities in London, including the rally-driver Jacqueline Evans de Lopez and Australian Prime Minister John Curtin.

On 30 September 1948 Karl Schenker was granted British citizenship. He died on 18 August 1954 at Putney Hospital in London's Borough of Wandsworth.

== Exhibitions ==
There was an exhibition of Schenker's photographs of wax mannequins at the Pinacoteca Agnelli for the Venice Biennale in 2013.

The Museum Ludwig in Cologne was able to buy around 100 photographs from the estate of photographer Hermann Koczyk from Oschatz in 2014 and dedicated a four-month retrospective to Karl Schenker in 2016.
