= Edmund Fürst =

German painter

Edmund Fürst, also Edmund Fuerst, (Hebrew: אדמונד פירסט; born 6 January 1874 in Berlin; died 1955 in Tel Aviv) was a German-Israeli painter and illustrator.

== Life ==
Edmund Fürst was born in 1874 in Berlin. His father Gustav Gerschon had studied art in Paris and later returned to Berlin where he achieved modest fame as an artist. Fürst's family hailed originally from Hungary from where they had migrated to Germany and settled in Frankfurt/Oder. Edmund attended the Realgymnasium in Berlin and the Berlin Academy of Arts for four years.

In 1902, he married Katharina-Johanna Lauda, the daughter of a wheat merchant. The young couple had a close relationship with the liberal rabbi, Dr. Lahmman, who supported Fürst's aspirations to become a well-known illustrator. He worked regularly for the Ullstein publishing house and participated in the exhibitions of the Berlin Association of Artists and the Berlin Secession. He also befriended Lyonel Feininger who later married Fürst's sister Clara. After serving in the German army in World War I, he returned to Berlin to work for Ullstein publishers illustrating books and magazines. During the years of the Weimar Republic, he used to travel extensively throughout Europe producing many oil and watercolor paintings of the countries he visited.

Following the advent of the Nazi dictatorship, Fürst was expelled from the German Labor Front, the Nazi-led compulsory trade union and dismissed from his job at Ullstein publishers. In the spring of 1934, he emigrated to Palestine together with his wife. His first major exhibition followed only a few months later in the fall of 1934 in the department store Maskit in Jerusalem. In the following years, he undertook many travels throughout Israel. It was during this period that he produced some of his most well-known watercolor paintings such as the views of the Lake Tiberia, Tzefat and Jerusalem.

Fürst's style of painting was mainly impressionist and most of his paintings convey a calm and serene atmosphere. Pastel colors and landscape paintings are characteristic of Fürst's repertoire. In his later years, he also painted a number of freestyle compositions on musical motifs.

== See also ==
- List of German painters

== Sources ==
- Thieme/Becker: Allgemeines Lexikon der Bildenden Künstler
- General Encyclopedia of the Arts, Tel Aviv
- Research: Yael Goldman of the Goethe-Institute in Tel Aviv, Israel; translation: Pavel Goldenberg, Frankfurt am Main.
