= Lyonel Feininger: A Definitive Catalogue of His Graphic Work =

1972 book by Leona E. Prasse

- Author: Leona E. Prasse
- Language: English and German
- Subject: Lyonel Feininger
- Genre: Art history
- Publisher: Case Western Reserve University Press, Gebr. Mann Verlag
- Publication date: 1972
- Pages: 304
- ISBN: 978-0910386180

Lyonel Feininger: A Definitive Catalogue of His Graphic Work is a 1972 book by Leona E. Prasse. Covering the graphic works of the artist Lyonel Feininger, it features hundreds of his woodcuts, etchings, and lithographs, most of which were made from 1918 to 1920. It was published in an English-German bilingual format, with the subject being a long-time resident in both Germany and the United States.

A curator of the Cleveland Museum of Art with experience with Feininger's work, Prasse received a Guggenheim Fellowship to study Feininger's work and spent twelve years on the book. Reviewers praised the book for its importance but gave minor criticism for unnecessary details.

== Contents ==
Lyonel Feininger: A Definitive Catalogue of His Graphic Work features the work of the titular artist; although he worked on paintings, he also worked in woodcutting and printmaking, which are the focus of the book. Primarily dating from 1918 to 1920, 320 woodcuts, 65 etchings, and 20 lithographs are catalogued in the book, with each description from Prasse. The catalogued prints are measured in the metric system.

The book has a foreword was written by Sherman Lee, who was at the time director of the Cleveland Museum of Art (the author's then-employer); he describes the catalogue as "a genuinely Herculean labor" due to the effort involved in procuring and presenting the prints depicted in the book. A list of collections containing Feininger prints is present, as well as a bibliography and list of exhibitions.

Printed in the letter format, the book has 304 pages and 550 illustrations. It is also bilingual in English and German, with Feininger a long-time resident in both Germany and the United States.

== Production and publication ==
Leona E. Prasse joined the Cleveland Museum of Art in 1925, serving as a curator for four decades until her retirement in 1967. During that time, her curatorial work included Lyonel Feininger's 1951 solo exhibition at the CMA, as well as a 1960 memorial exhibition in Feininger's honor. She and Henry Sayles Francis also commissioned a Feininger lithograph named Off the Coast for the Cleveland Print Club around the time of the 1951 exhibition.

In 1956, she was awarded a Guggenheim Fellowship to study Feininger's work, having received personal support from Feininger himself shortly before his death; she then worked on the book for twelve years, gathering around a thousand photographs in the process. Prasse found the process in Berlin arduous, recalling: "We had to write back and forth with proofs and corrections. You can't imagine how long that takes. It's not like being able to pick up the telephone and clear up a question." Annegret Janda, whose husband Karl-Heinz Janda was an art historian specialized in Feininger, helped prepare the translation and index. Following Feininger's death, his widow Julia assisted in finishing work on the catalogue.

The book was released by the Cleveland Museum of Art in 1972. It was printed by Berlin-based printing business Brüder Hartmann and distributed by Case Western Reserve University Press. It was sold at the museum sales desk for $35. A German edition was distributed by Gebr. Mann Verlag; the book's bilingual nature allowed the book to use same printing plates for both editions. A CMA advertisement aimed the book towards students, historians, and collectors.

== Reception ==
Helen Borsick of The Plain Dealer praised it as "an important book in the scholarly publishing field, print world and Feininger circles. Handsome, significant. A book for an author to be proud of, and one that should have a following in Cleveland where there are Feininger works in many collections." Henning Bock called it "a masterpiece in its field" and an improvement over Hans Hess' 1959 Feininger book, which he said had only one paragraph on Feininger's graphic works and "fail[ed] to note their real significance". Harold Joachim called the catalogue "indispensable not only for every print collection in the world but for everyone involved with twentieth-century art".

Joachim and Yuhuan Zhang drew comparisons to Eberhard W. Kornfeld's 1963 Paul Klee catalogue and Hans Konrad Röthel's 1970 Wassily Kandinsky catalogue, with Joachim elaborating that the book's "eagerly awaited" publication created a full set of the Bauhaus printmaker-painter trio. Bock and Joachim remarked that Prasse was sufficiently experienced for the book's job, citing both her experience with Feininger's works and friendship with the Feiningers.

Despite the positive feedback, the book was not without its criticisms. Joachim criticized the "Acknowledgements" for being unnecessarily long, and questioned the need for a German translation, citing the expectations of experience with the language in graphic arts, as well as the arbitrary sizing of the reproductions as "on a book designer's whim", but argued that they were minor compared to the catalogue's quality.

== See also ==
- Museum Lyonel Feininger
