= Julia Feininger =

German-American artist and art patron (1880-1970)

- Born: Julia Lilienfeld; 23 November 1880; Berlin, German Empire
- Died: 7 August 1970 (aged 89); Syosset, New York, U.S.
- Resting place: Mount Hope Cemetery, Hastings-on-Hudson, New York, U.S.
- Education: Grand Ducal Saxon Art School
- Movement: Bauhaus
- Spouse: Walter Berg (m. 1903; div. 1905) Lyonel Feininger (m. 1908; died 1956)
- Children: 3 (including Andreas and T. Lux)

Julia Feininger (née Lilienfeld; 23 November 1880 – 7 August 1970) was a German-American artist and art patron. While an art student, she met her husband Lyonel Feininger and influenced him to start an independent art career, with the two starting a creative partnership, before she reduced her output while raising her children. She was involved in the Bauhaus alongside her husband, creating several ceramics and puppets.

With the rise of the Nazi regime, the Jewish Feininger fled alongside her husband to the United States, where she worked as an essayist and exhibition organizer. Following her husband's death in 1956, she worked to preserve his legacy.

== Biography ==
=== Early life and education ===
Julia Lilienfeld was born on 23 November 1880 in Berlin. An only child, her parents were Bernhard Lilienfeld, who was head of the Berlin branch of coffee company A. Zuntz sel. Wwe., and Jeanette Zuntz. After graduating from a senior girls' school aged 15 and Adolf Meyer's Damenatelier in 1900, she studied at the Association of Women Artists and Art Lovers from 1900 to 1901; there, her teacher was painter Martin Brandenburg. In 1903, she married physician Walter Berg.

In July 1905, en route to a holiday at Graal-Müritz, she met Lyonel Feininger, whom she later encouraged to abandon his career as a caricaturist and turn to an independent art career. Receiving support from her new partner, in October 1905 she enrolled in the Grand Ducal Saxon Art School in Weimar, where she began studying graphic techniques to perfect her painting technique; at that school, Otto Rasch was her etching and lithography teacher and Berthold Paul Förster was her life nature drawing teacher.

=== Art career and partnership with Lyonel ===
At the school, she started a creative partnership with Feininger, even signing their own work together. She also preceded her future husband as an oil painter, with one of her works a portrait of classmate Susanne Hornbostel. As Huber noted, her artistry had recovered due to her relationship with Feininger after an unhappy first marriage, and "Lyonel Feininger's career as an artist is almost inconceivable without" her given that she inspired him to engage with newer formats of art. She moved to Weimar the same month, with her husband joining her in March 1906.

In July 1906, she and her new partner moved to Paris, where they both attended the Académie Colarossi and published drawings in the magazine Le Témoin, in her case under the anadrome Regninief. She also encouraged Lyonel to take up painting. The couple, having divorced from their previous spouses (in Julia's case, in 1905), married in London on 25 September 1908. The couple had three children: Andreas, Laurence, and T. Lux Feininger; she also had two stepdaughters from Lyonel's previous marriage to Clara Fürst: Lore and Marianne. In October 1908, they moved to Germany, where magazines Das Schnauferl and Sporthumor published drawings she made; their home was located in Zehlendorf, Berlin.

Feininger reduced her art career to care for her children, but still exhibited some of her work at the 27th Société des Artistes Indépendants exhibition in Paris in 1911. In April 1912, some of her works appeared at a modern cut silhouettes exhibition at the Hohenzollern-Kunstgewerbehaus in Berlin. She also had two pencil portraits from her husband, dated to 1913.

In 1919, her husband became the first master at the Bauhaus, and she returned to Weimar alongside him. In 1920, she became a full-time student at the Bauhaus, where she had previously enrolled in his husband's nature class, though she dropped out the same year. Enthusiastic about newfound mediums, she also created ceramic works at the Bauhaus pottery workshop. In 1922, Otto Dix (a friend of the couple) made an oil painting of her. At the Bauhaus stage workshop, Feininger created puppets, with her work including seven puppets for a 1925 production of Märchen aus dem Morgenland, though the play was never performed. Around this time, she started a catalogue of her husband's paintings, paving the way for her role in his legacy.

After the closure of the Bauhaus in Weimar, the Feiningers moved to the Bauhaus Dessau compound on 30 July 1926; they lived in the same duplex as László Moholy-Nagy and his wife, which was next to that of Gropius. In 1927, Feininger herself became an American citizen. The Feiningers fled Dessau in 1933 amidst political escalation under the Nazi regime, and moved to Siemensstadt in October 1934. In May 1936, Julia accompanied her husband en route to the United States, where he taught at Mills College; Feininger was an art patron during their time in California. Later that year, they returned to Berlin via Stockholm and Hamburg.

=== Emigration to the United States ===
Due to Adolf Hitler's rise to power in 1933, Feininger suffered persecution as a Jew, and her husband were forced to emigrate from Nazi Germany on 11 June 1937. They traveled to New York on the ocean liner SS Manhattan. Before their escape, the Feiningers entrusted Hermann Klumpp (a friend from their time in Dessau) with a large portion of Lyonel's paintings. Julia helped move the paintings from their storage in the Moritzburg to Quedlinburg on 21 October 1935, allowing them to survive the Nazi regime's denunciation of Feininger's works as "degenerate art".

In January 1938, the Feininger couple moved to an apartment at 235 East 22nd Street in Manhattan's Gramercy Park, where she lived for more than thirty years. Feininger published works together with her husband, with topics including Paul Klee, Wassily Kandinsky, and Mark Tobey. She compiled catalogues raisonnés of his work and participated in the planning of several exhibitions. She also assisted Hans Hess in writing his eponymous 1959 Lyonel Feininger book, compiling the catalogue and providing the correspondence, and helped Leona E. Prasse finish her 1972 catalogue Lyonel Feininger: A Definitive Catalogue of His Graphic Work.

=== Later life and death ===
Following her husband's death in 1956, she served as custodian of his estate, and she helped preserve her husband's archives, resulting in the Harvard Art Museum's Lyonel Feininger Collection and Harvard University's Feininger Archive. She also gifted three of her husband's oil paintings to the Pasadena Art Museum, which later placed them for a 1969 exhibition. In July 1963, two Paul Klee paintings she owned went missing en route from a Denver Art Museum exhibition. By 1969, she was living in Cambridge, Massachusetts.

Feininger died on 7 August 1970, age 89, after a long illness at Syosset Hospital. She was buried with her husband in Mount Hope Cemetery in Hastings-on-Hudson, New York. Following her death, art dealer Ralph F. Colin and his son became the executor of her estate, which was later involved in a decade-long legal dispute over her husband's paintings.

Feininger has a few surviving works hosted in places such as the Bauhaus Museum Weimar, as well as private collections. As noted by Huber, the majority of her artwork is lost and known only from her husband's photographs, and few academics (such as Lina Assmann and Gloria Köpnick) have researched her work. In 2019, the Lyonel Feininger Gallery in Quedlinburg held an exhibition named The Feiningers: A Family Portrait at the Bauhaus, featuring Feininger's influence on his husband's artistic development and her oil paintings, and her puppets became part of the newly designed permanent exhibition of the Bauhaus Museum Weimar.
