= Leona E. Prasse =

American art curator (1897–1984)

- Born: August 4, 1897; Cleveland, Ohio, U.S.
- Died: December 23, 1984 (aged 87); Cleveland, Ohio, U.S.
- Occupations: Curator; art collector
- Awards: Guggenheim Fellowship (1956)

Academic background
- Education: Western Reserve University

Academic work
- Discipline: Prints and drawings
- Sub-discipline: Lyonel Feininger
- Institutions: Cleveland Museum of Art

Leona E. Prasse (August 4, 1897 – December 23, 1984) was an American curator and art collector. Specializing in prints, she worked at the Cleveland Museum of Art as a curator for four decades. Her curatorial work included two exhibitions related to Lyonel Feininger, and she donated her own collection to the CMA. A 1956 Guggenheim Fellow, she authored several catalogues, including Lyonel Feininger: A Definitive Catalogue of His Graphic Work (1972).

== Biography ==
Prasse was born on August 4, 1897, in Cleveland. She studied at Western Reserve University's Flora Stone Mather College branch, where she obtained a BS in 1919 and a ΒA in 1920. She also briefly attended the Cleveland School of Art (1920-1921) and took specialized courses at the main Western Reserve branch.

In 1925, Prasse joined the Cleveland Museum of Art. Originally an assistant, she became an assistant curator at the Department of Prints and Drawings in 1926 and was promoted to associate curator in 1930. Prasse's curatorial work included Lyonel Feininger's 1951 solo exhibition at the CMA, as well as a 1960 memorial exhibition in Feininger's honor. She was also a contributor to the catalogues of numerous CMA exhibitions in the 1940s and 1950s. In 1956, she was awarded a Guggenheim Fellowship "for studies of the graphic works of Lyonel Feininger". In 1967, she retired from the CMA. In 1972, the CMA published Lyonel Feininger: A Definitive Catalogue of His Graphic Work, which also had a foreword from Sherman Lee; she worked on the book with Feininger himself and, after his death, his widow Julia.

Prasse was instrumental in expanding the CMA's print collection. She donated hundreds of drawings and prints, including a personal collection that she previously amassed. Ranging from the Renaissance to contemporary, her collection included Bartolomé Esteban Murillo's study of a Virgin and Child painting held at the Metropolitan Museum of Art, as well as works from Pieter Bruegel the Elder, Charles E. Burchfield, Albrecht Dürer, Giovanni Battista Piranesi, Maurice Prendergast, Rembrandt, Pierre-Auguste Renoir, and Henri de Toulouse-Lautrec. She also donated a collection of dozens of Feininger works to the CMA. Fellow CMA curator Henry Sayles Francis recalled that Prasse "was always filling in the gaps" in her capacity as a donor, remarking that she could obtain artworks for the CMA further than the museum's resources.

Prasse was personally close to Feininger himself, and was an associate of the Print Club of Cleveland.

Prasse died on December 23, 1984, in Cleveland. She was 87. The CMA held Leona E. Prasse, Connoisseur and Curator, a memorial exhibition showcasing her collection in her honor.

== Publications ==
- Catalogue of an Exhibition of the Art of Lithography: Commemorating the Sesquicentennial of Its Invention, 1798-1948 (1948)
- (with Frederick S. Wight) The Work of Lyonel Feininger: Catalogue of an Exhibition (1951)
- (with Charles E. Burchfield) The Drawings of Charles E. Burchfield: Catalogue of an Exhibition Sponsored by the Print Club of Cleveland and the Cleveland Museum of Art, November 4 to December 31, 1953, the Cleveland Museum of Art (1953)
- Lyonel Feininger: A Definitive Catalogue of His Graphic Work (1972)
