= Richard Polak =

Dutch photographer (1870–1957)

- Born: 17 October 1870; Rotterdam, South Holland, Netherlands
- Died: 7 October 1957 (aged 86); Lausanne, Switzerland
- Occupation: Photographer
- Spouse: Ila Lucie Colclough (m. 1917; died 1951)
- Parent(s): Abraham Jeremias Polak; Jeanette Rosenthal

Richard Polak (17 October 1870, Rotterdam, the Netherlands – 7 October 1957, Lausanne, Switzerland) was a Dutch photographer. He was the son of Abraham Jeremias Polak, a dealer in textiles, and Jeanette Rosenthal.

== Career ==
In September 1913 Polak stayed in Berlin for six weeks to study with the photographer Karl Schenker, whom he had met in London. Schenker helped improve his technique and taught him various skills, including retouching.

His photographic career was short, starting in 1912 and ending three years later because he suffered from bad health (severe asthma). In January 1915 he was elected to the London Salon of Photography.

He sought to reproduce the domestic interiors seen in the paintings of 17th-century Dutch painters Johannes Vermeer and Jan Steen. He found it difficult to rent a suitable studio but eventually discovered the ideal room on the Houttuin Rotterdam with a good north light, the only drawback being that one had to approach it through a trap door. He then spent a considerable amount of money furnishing this with accessories bought at antique shops. He then photographed actors dressed in attires typical of that time.

== Subsequent life ==
In 1917, he married Ila Lucie Colclough (died 30 May 1951), who originated from London. He moved to Lausanne in 1932. This relocation, as he was Jewish, saved him from the fate of much of Dutch Jewry during the war. He was active assisting Dutch war refugees in Switzerland; Polak and received the Zilveren Erkentelijkheidsmedaille (Silver Medal of Recognition) from the Dutch Ministry of Foreign Affairs in 1946. In 1950, he was made a Knight in the Order of Orange-Nassau. He died in Lausanne in 1957.

== Legacy ==
His major work was a folio of pictures, "Photographs from Life in Old Dutch Costume" published in 1923, which includes an introduction by the British art photographer F.J. Mortimer. His best-known picture is "Artist and his Model" (1914). Despite critics contending that his work was repetitive and that he made unsuccessful attempts at recreating scenes from the past, he has since become the subject of some retrospectives. His work is included in The Royal Photographic Society Collection of the Victoria & Albert Museum in London.
