= Neulobeda =

District in Jena, Thuringia, Germany

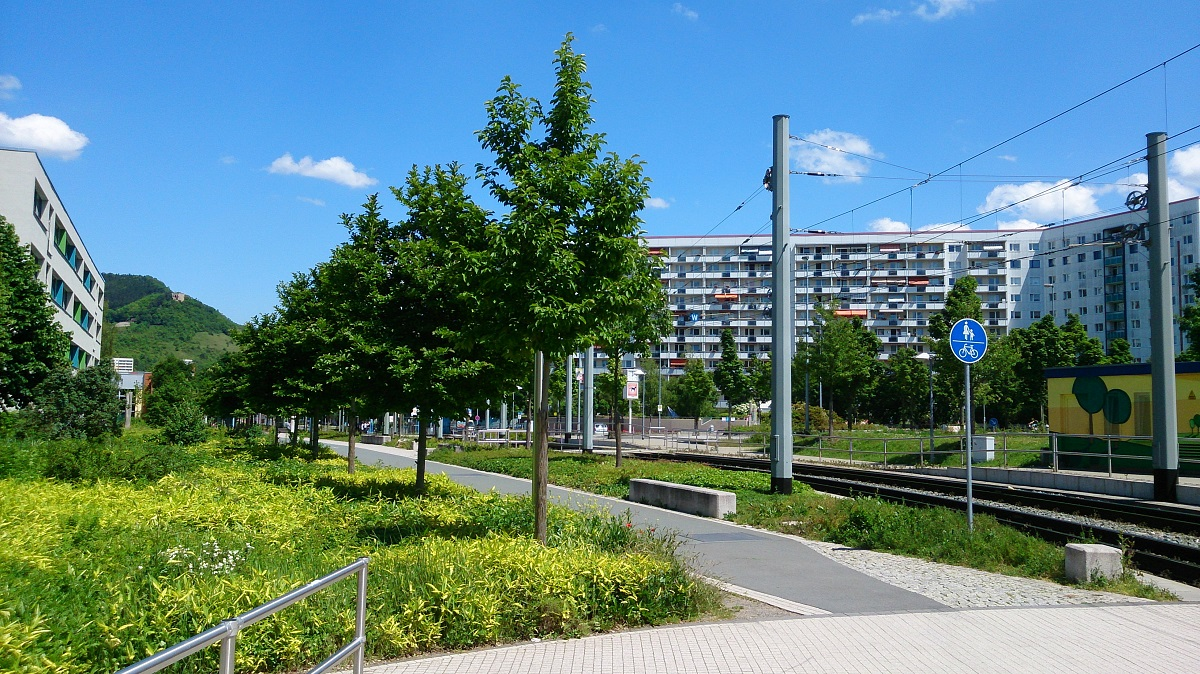
Lobeda-West (2014)

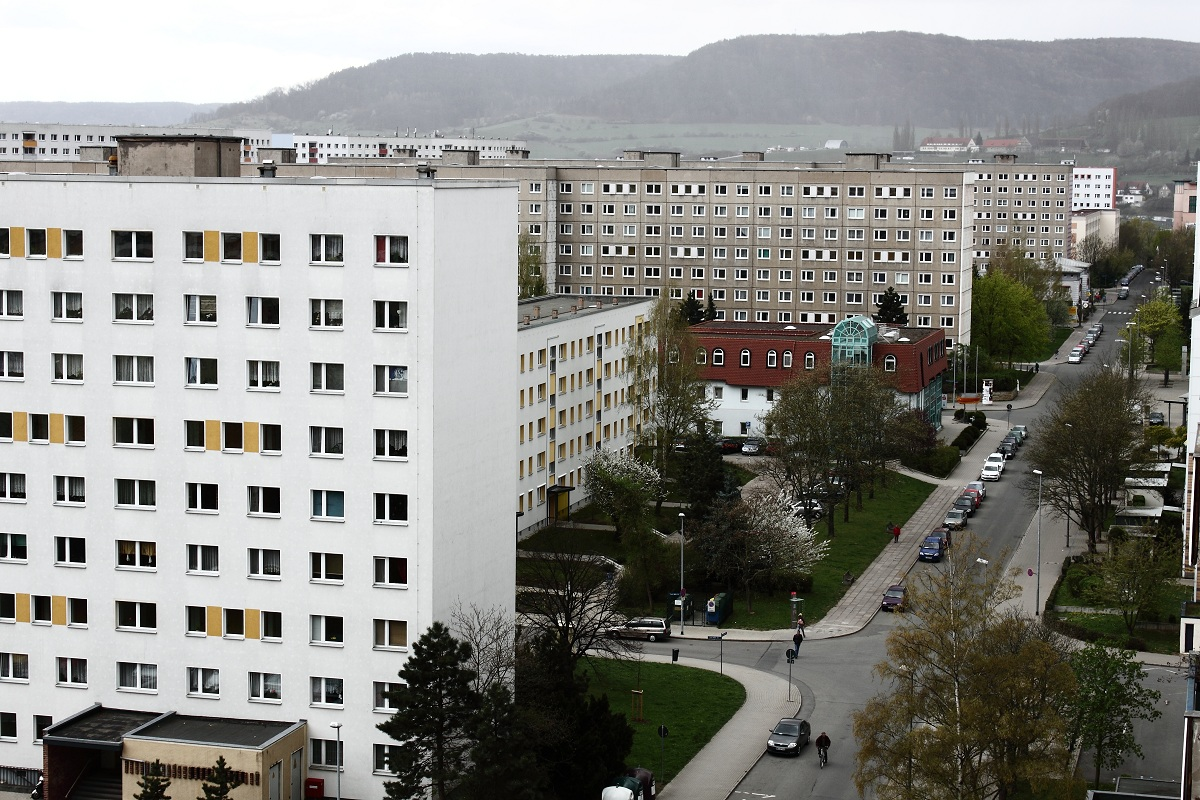
Stauffenbergstraße in Lobeda-West (2011)

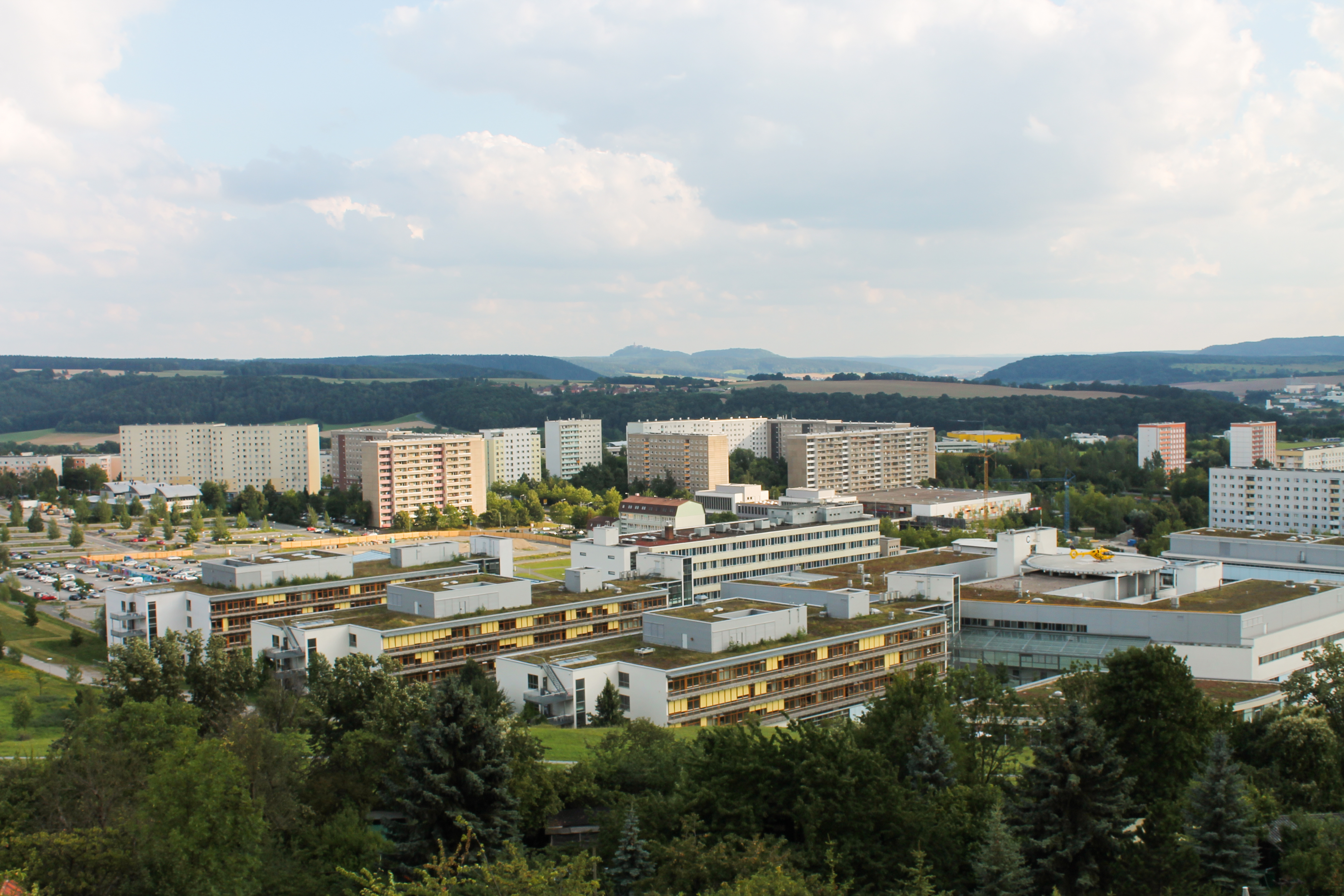
The University Hospital Jena in the foreground, behind it residential blocks in Lobeda-East

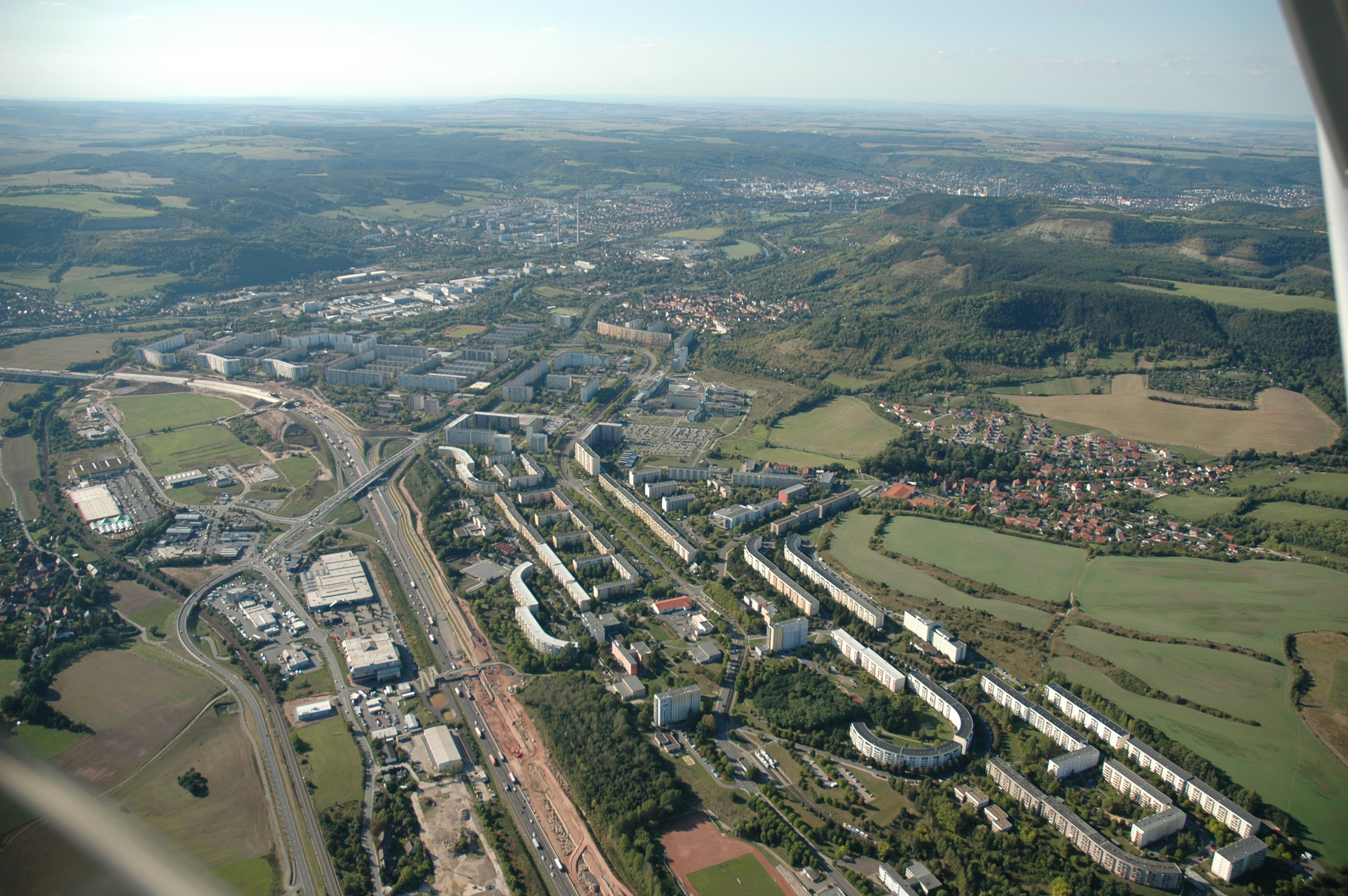
Aerial view, in the foreground Lobeda-East, in the background on the left Lobeda-West (2008)

Neulobeda (literally New Lobeda) is the largest district of the Thuringian university town Jena with over 22,000 residents. The residents are distributed over an area of 3.6 km^{2}. This results in a very high population density of 6164 inhabitants per km^{2}. The prefabricated satellite city, located about seven kilometers south of the city center, was constructed under the names Neulobeda-West and Neulobeda-East between 1966 and 1986. Both parts of the so-called new development area border directly on the farmland of the eponymous district Lobeda-Old Town.

The boundary between Lobeda-West and Lobeda-East, as the common terms are, is formed by Stadtrodaer Straße, laid out in 1968 and only named after 1989.

== History ==
The first groundbreaking for the development took place on November 20, 1964. The new town district was mainly built between 1966 and 1986 for the employees of the Carl-Zeiss combine. The aim was to create rental apartments with district heating and comfort for about 40,000 people. Mainly young families with children moved into the new development area.

Neulobeda was created in several stages from west to east: The first finished residential buildings were in Neulobeda-West along today's Stauffenbergstraße (then Otto-Grotewohl-Straße) and the adjacent Angerstraßen and were ready for occupancy from December 1967. The development initially took place via a temporary construction exit from Stadtrodaer Straße. In the spring of 1968, there was a first temporary sales point in food retail, as well as a post office and a doctor's office. In 1970 a first department store was opened. Not until around 1970 were the traffic conditions comprehensively improved, when the first sections of Karl-Marx-Allee were completed. From 1971, residential areas were built to the east of Stadtrodaer Straße up to approximately Ebereschenstraße, then Heinrich-Rau-Straße. The first apartments in Neulobeda-East were occupied in May 1972. In August 1975, the road bridge over Stadtrodaer Straße was completed, so that Karl-Marx-Allee has since been continuously drivable. Now Neulobeda was integrated in its present form with the "Spider" as a powerful road intersection into Stadtrodaer Straße. The last section was the eastern settlement area in the early 1980s, which extends beyond the city limits into the territory of the Drackendorf community. The apartments on Salvador-Allende-Platz were the first to be occupied in 1982. In the subsequent period, the last new buildings in Lobeda-East were completed, so that

Karl-Marx-Allee has been continuously passable since then. Now Neulobeda was integrated in its current form with the "Spider" as a powerful road intersection into Stadtrodaer Straße. The last section to be completed in the early 1980s was the eastern settlement area, which extends beyond the city limits into the municipality of Drackendorf. In 1982, the first apartments on Salvador-Allende-Platz could be occupied. Subsequently, the last new buildings in Lobeda-East were completed, with which the new building project Neulobeda could be completed around 1988. The Karl-Marx-Allee was designed so that a tram could be installed on its own track bed at a later date, but this did not happen during the GDR times. Therefore, the establishment of numerous efficient bus lines was necessary, connecting Neulobeda with Winzerla and the city center. The current commercial area Lobeda-Süd, which is located beyond the highway, was only established after 1990.

As a result of the political turnaround in the GDR in 1989, social classes also formed in Jena, whose representatives can be relatively well assigned on the basis of their material wealth. This changed the demands of the so-called middle class on their living environment (from modern panel apartment to own home with garden) and the residential area went through a self-dynamic downward spiral of image loss and social mixing.

Even higher-level post-reunification phenomena such as increasing excess mortality, loss of population, and mass unemployment, as well as the ensuing individually experienced hopelessness, thwarted the revaluation of Neulobeda for a long time and paved the way for symptoms of decay, specifically for the loss of mutual social control, increasing crime, open extremism, and vandalism. By the mid-1990s, Neulobeda was on its way to becoming a Social Hotspot, even though the commercial infrastructure improved during these years.

In 1998, the districts Lobeda-West and Lobeda-East were merged into the village of Neulobeda, with which the previously only colloquial term was officially used for the first time. The residents elected the Local Council and Local Mayor on November 27, 1998. This office has since been held by Volker Blumentritt (SPD).

Under the names Lobeda-West and Lobeda-East, the Jena city administration leads both villages as statistical districts, but still separates the panel buildings in the Drackendorf/Lobeda-East district from Lobeda-East.

To improve the living situation in the district, numerous apartments and areas were modernized from the federal-state program The Social City. The adjacent Federal Highway 4 was lowered in the Lobeda area by 2010 and housed. The lowering was stabilized on the slope side by large natural stone blocks, a green space of about 7 hectares was created above the almost 600-meter-long housing.

== Various ==
In 2022, Neulobeda was object of the exhibition "Sabine Moritz. Lobeda or the Reconstruction of a World" in the Museum Lyonel Feininger in Quedlinburg in Saxony-Anhalt in Germany.
