= Adam Jankowski =

Austrian painter

- Born: 1948 (age 77–78); Gdańsk
- Education: Vienna Academy; Academy of Fine Arts Hamburg
- Known for: conceptual art
- Website: adamjankowski.de

Adam Jankowski (born 1948 in Gdańsk, Poland) is an Austrian painter and professor at the Offenbach University of Art & Design. His studio is located in St. Pauli, Hamburg, Germany.

The early work of Jankowski is closely related to the '68 movement. The political subject of his painting was seen as a provocation at that time. The artistic career of Adam Jankowski has always been characterized by exchanges with other artists like Uwe Schneede and Robert Lettner. Up to the present Jankowski's work is dedicated to the question of landscape painting in the age of digital imaging technologies.

== Life ==
Adam Jankowski grew up in Gdańsk, Poland, but he moved in 1955 to Warsaw and in 1961 with his parents to Vienna where he became Austrian. From 1966 to 1968 he studied mechanical engineering at the Vienna University of Technology, and from 1968 to 1970 he studied painting hence the Vienna Academy under Franz Elsner. Leaving the traditional oriented School of Vienna he went to Hamburg and studied at the Academy of Fine Arts Hamburg at Almir Mavignier and KP Brehmer (1970–1976). Additional, he studied art history at the University of Hamburg, at Klaus Herding and Bredekamp 1976 to 1980.

Already in the late 1970s, his work learned more attention when he more attention the Austrian State scholarship for Fine Arts. Jankowski founded in 1986 together with KP Brehmer, Anna Oppermann, Dagmar Fedderke, Constatin Hahm, Herbert Hossmann and Gesine Petersen the Artists Cooperative "Gallery Vorsetzen", he was also the co-founder of the autonomous cultural policy initiative Free Association of Visual Artists of Hamburg and the Working Group Fine Arts in Hamburg.

From 1984, Jankowski taught at the Hamburg University of Applied Sciences, where he remained until 1985. In 1987 he became a professor of painting at the University of Art & Design Offenbach am Main. His students include many successful artists, including Parastou Forouhar, Sabine Moritz, Julia Oschatz, Henning Strassburger, and Peter Zizka
