= Museum Lyonel Feininger =

- Entrance to the museum
- Established: 1986
- Location: Quedlinburg, Saxony-Anhalt, Germany
- Coordinates: 51.7872°N 11.1361°E
- Type: Art museum
- Director: Adina Christine Rösch
- Website: www.museum-feininger.de/en/

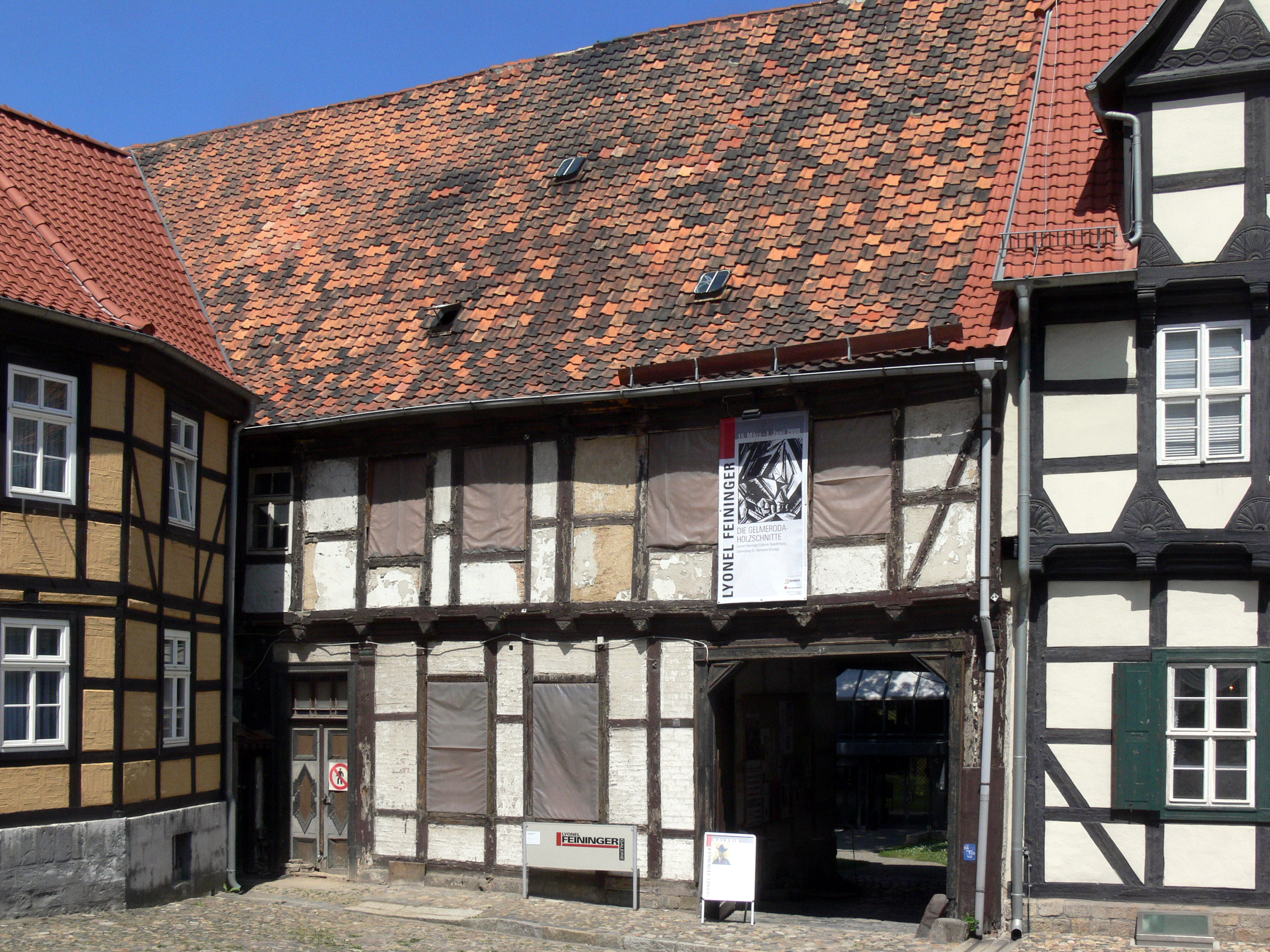
Building called Kürassierhof with gateway to the museum courtyard (2008)

The Museum Lyonel Feininger, formerly Lyonel Feininger Gallery, is an art museum in Quedlinburg, in the Land Saxony-Anhalt in Germany. The museum collection is registered as a movable cultural heritage monument in the local register of monuments under the registration number 094 21194.

== History ==
The Lyonel Feininger Gallery was founded in 1986 when East Germany still existed. It hosts the works by the Bauhaus master artist Lyonel Feininger which Hermann Klumpp, a former student of the Bauhaus and Quedlinburg native, saved from destruction by the Nazis.

In 1997, the Lyonel Feininger Gallery was extended by a new building. It offers a contrast to Quedlinburg's predominantly medieval old town, which was included in the UNESCO World Heritage List in 1994.

In 2006, the Gallery was integrated into the Kunstmuseum Moritzburg Halle (Saale), run by the Moritzburg Foundation in Halle (Saale).

In 2006, the Lyonel Feininger Gallery was included in the Blaubuch of the Federal Government Commissioner for Culture and the Media as one of the 23 culturally most important sites in the eastern Länder of Germany.

In 2013, the museum buildings expanded again. It includes the renovated half-timbered building Schlossberg 11 and a newly built side wing, thus adding additional exhibition space and a studio for art education.

Since 2014, the museum is part of the Kulturstiftung Sachsen-Anhalt (Cultural Foundation of Saxony-Anhalt). The gallery was expanded into a "Museum of Graphic Arts".

In 2023, the museum was renamed ″museum Lyonel Feininger. world heritage city Quedlinburg″.

The Museum Lyonel Feininger is the only museum dedicated to Lyonel Feininger in the world.

== Collection ==
The collection includes the artist's prints, etchings, lithographs and woodcuts. It documents all his creative periods in Germany from the 1890s to 1937. Works by Lovis Corinth, Wassily Kandinsky, Paul Klee and Emil Nolde complement the collection. Since 2005, permanent loans from the Deutsche Stiftung Denkmalschutz (German cultural heritage foundation) are shown. In 2019, the collection was expanded to include important caricatures and comic drawings from the artist's early work of the 1890s and the early years of the 20th century with the establishment of the dependent Lyonel Feininger Collection Armin Rühl Foundation. For conservation reasons, the light-sensitive holdings of the works on paper can only be shown in changing presentations.

In April 2022, a new permanent exhibition on the life and work of Lyonel Feininger under the title Lyonel Feininger. Master of Moderism was opened. It provides an overview of the multifaceted work of the caricaturist, graphic artist, painter, Bauhaus master and photographer. In addition, the creative Feininger family of artists and the eventful history of the museum are also highlighted.

In May 2022, the German Federal President Frank-Walter Steinmeier visited the Museum Lyonel Feininger. The opening speech of the exhibition "Sabine Moritz. Lobeda or the Reconstruction of a World" in August 2022, held the Swiss curator Hans Ulrich Obrist.

== Directors ==
- 1986–2005: Ingrid Wernecke
- 2005–2007: Norbert Eisold Management
- 2007–2014: Björn Egging
- 2014–2020: Michael Freitag
- 2020–2022: Gloria Köpnick
- since 2023: Adina Christine Rösch

== Friends Association ==
The Friends Association, founded in 1998, supports the work of the museum. In 2015, it had 154 members.

== Exhibitions ==
- In 2019, on the occasion of the anniversary year, 100 years of Bauhaus was celebrated with the exhibition Die Feiningers. A Family Portrait which addressed for the first time at the Bauhaus the collaboration of numerous members of the Feininger family over three generations.
- 27 March 2021 to 9 January 2022: Becoming Feininger. Lyonel Feininger on his 150th birthday
- 3 April to 31 July 2022: From Rembrandt to Richter. Masterpieces from the Prints and Drawings Collection of the Landesmuseum Oldenburg.

== See also ==
- Konferenz Nationaler Kultureinrichtungen
- Kunstmuseum Moritzburg Halle (Saale)
- Lyonel Feininger
- Lyonel Feininger: A Definitive Catalogue of His Graphic Work
