= Clara Fürst =

German pianist

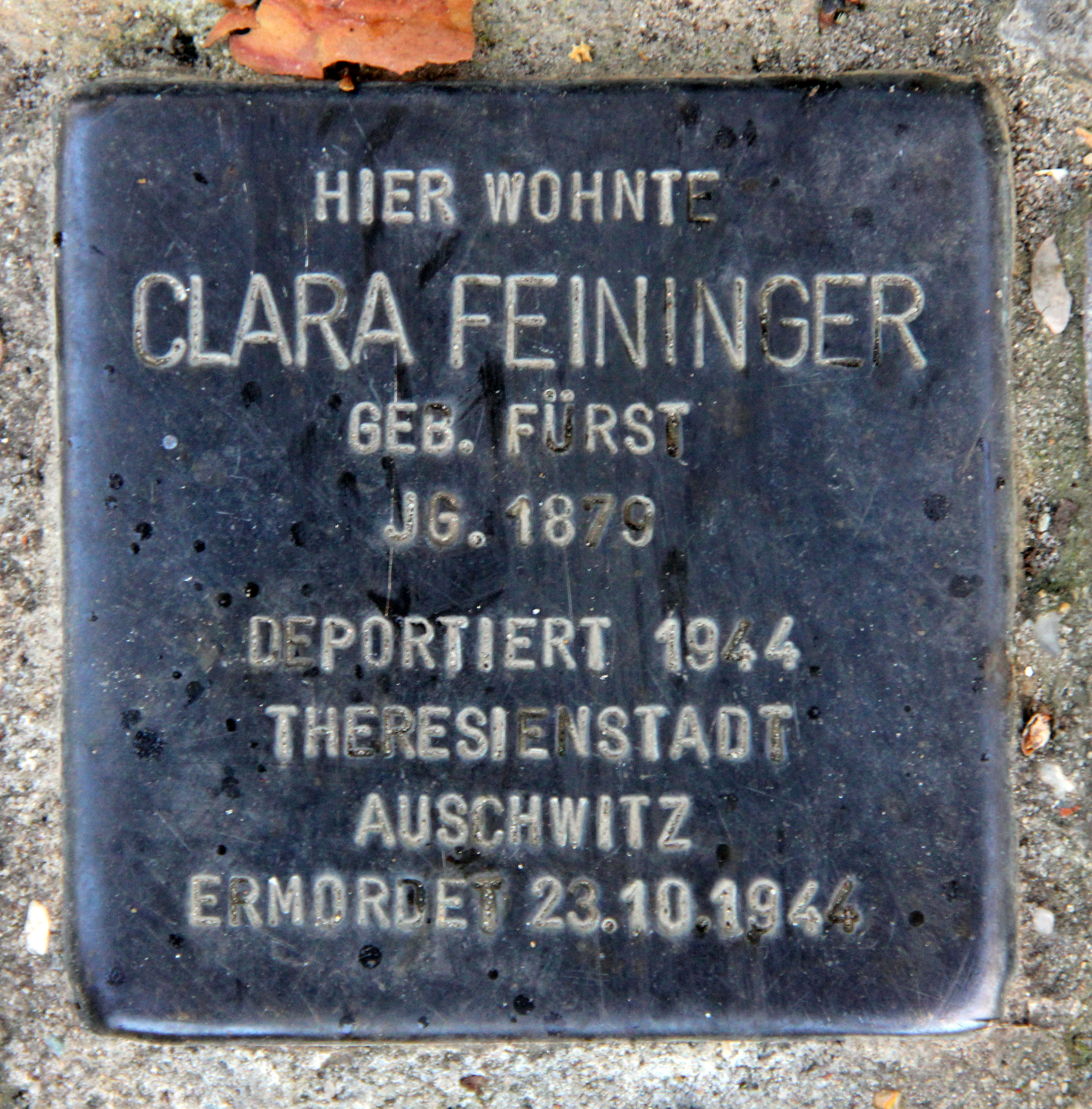
Stolperstein in Berlin.

Clara Fürst (15 February 1879 in Berlin – 1944 in Auschwitz) was a concert pianist. Daughter of the painter Gustav Fürst she was the first wife of a German-American painter, and leading exponent of Expressionism, Lyonel Feininger. The Fürst family hailed originally from Hungary from where they had migrated to Germany and settled in Frankfurt/Oder.

== Personal life ==
In 1900, Clara Fürst met Lyonel Feininger in Berlin through her brother Edmund Fürst (1874–1955), who, like Lyonel Feininger had studied at the Berlin Art Academy for several years.

They married in 1901, and they had two daughters. In 1905 they separated. The first-born of these daughters was the photographer and artist Eleonore Feininger (born 1901) who began her photographic activities in the studio of Karl Schenker in Berlin. The second daughter was Marianne, born in 1902.

Clara Feininger had lived in Berlin-Steglitz, Birkbuschstrasse 6 for about 20 years after 1915.

While Edmund Fürst and his family emigrated to Palestine in 1934 and Lyonel Feininger, whose Cubism-based art was considered "degenerate" by the National Socialists, moved to the US in 1937, Clara Feininger stayed in Berlin. She probably lived off the maintenance payments Lyonel Feininger had to make after the divorce in 1907.

Around 1939 she lived temporarily outside Berlin in Schöneiche, but returned to Berlin in 1941 and lived at Beethovenstraße 29 in Lichtenrad, subletting from Hildegard and Werner Braun.

== Transportation & Death ==
Clara was classified as a Geltungsjüdin (Jewish by Validity) under the Nazi Party's Nuremberg Laws as her father had been Jewish and her mother was not. The fact that she left the Jewish community in February 1938 did not protect her from further persecution. On 10 January 1944 she was deported to Theresienstadt in the 99th transport to that concentration camp and from there to Auschwitz on 23 October 1944, where she was murdered.
