= T. Lux Feininger =

American painter

- Born: June 11, 1910; Berlin, German Empire
- Died: July 7, 2011 (aged 101); Cambridge, Massachusetts, United States
- Spouse(s): Jeanne (married ????–????; her death); Patricia Randall (married 1954–????)
- Children: Charles, Conrad, and Lucas
- Parents: Lyonel Feininger (father); Julia Feininger (mother)

Theodore Lukas (alias T. Lux) Feininger (June 11, 1910 – July 7, 2011) was a German-American painter, avant-garde photographer, author, and art teacher. Born in Berlin to Julia (née Lilienfeld) and Lyonel Feininger, an American living in Germany from the age of sixteen, his father was appointed as the Master of the Printing Workingshop at the newly formed Bauhaus art school in Weimar by Walter Gropius in 1919. He had two older full brothers, namely Andreas Feininger, and Laurence Feininger, as well as two half sisters, even older, including Lore Feininger, by Clara Fürst and his father (from his first marriage).

== Early career begins with photography ==
At sixteen, Lux Feininger became a student at the Bauhaus at Dessau, where he studied painting with Josef Albers, Paul Klee, and Wassily Kandinsky, played in the Bauhauskapelle, the Bauhaus jazz band, and participated in experimental theater. It was here that he began taking photographs and assumed the role of an artistic photojournalist chronicling the daily life at Bauhaus. Although no photographic studio was part of the Bauhaus until 1929, his photography was influenced by the aesthetic of László Moholy-Nagy, who lived adjacent to the Feininger family. Soon Feininger was selling his photographs to periodicals and newspapers through an agency. By 1929 his work was featured in Film und Foto, a survey of modern photography.

A retrospective of his early photography was held in 1962 at the Busch-Reisinger Museum in Cambridge, Massachusetts and in 2001, the Metropolitan Museum of Art, in Manhattan, showed his works at an exhibit entitled, Dancing on the Roof: Photography and the Bauhaus (1923-1929).

== Painting career begins in 1929 ==
In 1929 he also began to exhibit his paintings under a pseudonym, Theodore Lux, by which his stated intention was to avoid preferential treatment arising from the fame of his father. These are his first and second given names without his family name, he had never used his first name prior to this time. His initial paintings included maritime subjects, frequently of old sailing ships. From 1930 to 1935 he spent time in Paris. In 1936 Feininger left Germany and settled in the United States. His family had been targeted by the Nazis as undesirable foreigners participating in "decadent" cultural activities and they, along with many Bauhaus artists and designers, emigrated. The majority of the negatives for his collection of photographs had been left behind during his departure from Germany and none of these have been recovered.

In 1937 he had his first solo show of paintings in Manhattan. Transportation subjects such as train locomotives, as well as, toys were featured in his paintings along with what The New York Times described as, striking self-portraits. After the United States entered World War II, Feininger served in its army intelligence.

In 1947 he ceased using the pseudonym to sign his paintings and began using his family name in his signature. During the 1940s he continued his photography as a personal activity only, focusing upon transportation subjects that included ferries, ships, trains, and trucks as well as street scenes in Manhattan. He never exhibited this later photography, however, and completely abandoned the art in 1950s.

During the 1950s Feininger painted a mural in the home of John M. van Beuren that was being built near Morristown, New Jersey by architect, Bertrand Goldberg. A personal friend of Feininger, van Beuren was the brother of Michael van Beuren, a Bauhaus furniture designer who hosted Gropius and other Bauhaus staff and faculty members fleeing the Nazis, at a van Beuren family residence in México while they relocated and selected destinations in the Americas for refuge. The mural was not able to be relocated when van Beuren commissioned Ludwig Mies van der Rohe for the next home built for van Beuren nearby on the family estate, but it was documented by other members of the Bauhaus community.

By the 1960s Feininger had adopted the semi-abstract prismatic painting style of his father and Kandinsky. He continued to paint for the remainder of his life.

A joint exhibition of Feininger's paintings was held in 2010 at the Berlin and the Manhattan galleries of Moeller Fine Art. In 2011 the Kunsthalle in Kiel, Germany presented a traveling exhibition, World Sailor: T. Lux Feininger on His 100th Birthday, that also was exhibited at the Lyonel Feininger Gallery in Quedlinburg, Germany, a town now on the UNESCO world heritage list.

== Writing and teaching ==
Writing was another professional activity by Feininger and he wrote several books. He was considered an accomplished writer with a distinctive style.

In 1965 he authored a book, entitled Lyonel Feininger: City at the Edge of the World, about his father and his wooden sculptures of toy ships, trains, and fantasy cities, for which his brother, the photographer Andreas Feininger, provided the photographs.

In 2001 Hatje Cantz Verlag in Stuttgart published his, Feininger, A family of artists, which was edited by Wolfgang Büche. In 2006 the German publishing house Mitteldeutscher Verlag, Halle (Saale), published his, Two Worlds: My life as an artist between Bauhaus and America.

Feininger taught at Sarah Lawrence College, Harvard's Fogg Museum, and the School of The Museum of Fine Arts, Boston before his retirement in 1975.

== Personal information ==
Feininger's first wife, Jeanne, died within a few years of their marriage. In 1954 he married Patricia Randall and they had three sons, Charles, Conrad, and Lucas. Lux Feininger lived to be 101 years old, dying on July 7, 2011, in Cambridge, Massachusetts.
