= Kate Simon =

Polish-born American writer (1912 – 1990)

Kate Simon (December 5, 1912 – February 4, 1990) was a Polish-born American writer.

== Life and career ==
She was born Kaila Grobsmith in Warsaw, Poland to Jewish parents, David, a shoe designer, and Lonia (née Babicz), a corsetiere. Her family brought her to the United States when she was four, where they rejoined her father. Kate was raised in the Bronx, New York, and attended Hunter College where she earned a B.A. Her writing career began as a book reviewer for The New Republic and The Nation magazines. She worked for Book-of-the-Month Club, Publishers Weekly, and as a free-lance editor for Alfred A. Knopf. Against her father's wishes, she switched from vocational school to James Monroe High School. On a vacation at a Yiddish leftist encampment in the Catskills with her mother and siblings, she met the Bergsons, who served as surrogate parents for her and for whose children she served as nanny. She became an English major at Hunter College.

Simon became a well-known travel writer. Several of her guides became best sellers. Her autobiography was written in three parts. The first, Bronx Primitive: Portraits in a Childhood (1982) was one of The New York Times's twelve best books of 1982 and was nominated for a National Book Critics Circle Award. This was followed by Wider World: Portraits in an Adolescence (1986) that told of her teen age period and college experiences. The third volume, Etchings in an Hourglass (1990) is about her adulthood. Her work, Fifth Avenue: A Very Social Story (1978), is a social history of Manhattan. A Renaissance Tapestry: The Gonzaga of Mantua (1988) tells the story of the Renaissance through the history of the Gonzaga family.

She was married twice. Her first husband (possibly common-law) was Dr. Stanley "Steve" Goldman, a deaf endocrinologist whom she had met at Hunter College. Dr. Goldman (died 1942), as well as Simon's only child, Alexandra "Lexie" (died 1954, aged 20), and her younger sister, Sylvia, all died of brain tumors. She was divorced from her second husband, Robert Simon, in 1960 after 12-13 years of marriage. Kate Simon was diagnosed with stomach cancer in 1989, and died a year later, aged 77, at her Manhattan home.

== Bibliography ==
- Etchings in an Hourglass (1990)
- A Renaissance Tapestry: The Gonzaga of Mantua (1988)
- Mexico, Places and Pleasures (1988)
- A Wider World: Portraits in an Adolescence (1986)
- Italy: The Places In Between (1984)
- Bronx Primitive: Portraits in a Childhood (1982)
- Fifth Avenue: A Very Social History (1979)
- England's Green and Pleasant Land (1974)
- Rome: Places and Pleasures (1972)
- Paris Places and Pleasures: An Uncommon Guidebook (1971)
- New York Places and Pleasures: An Uncommon Guidebook (1971)
- London Places and Pleasures: An Uncommon Guidebook (1968)
- Mexico: Places and Pleasures (1963)
