= Lobeda =

Coordinates: 50°53′35″N 11°36′32″E

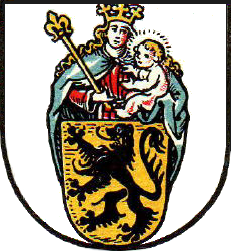
- Flag

Lobeda is a former independent city in Thuringia, Germany, which is now a district of Jena known as Lobeda-Old Town. It was incorporated in 1946, has just under 2000 inhabitants on an area of 3.36 square kilometers and is located just under 4.5 kilometers south of the city center.

Between 1966 and 1986, the Jena prefabricated satellite town of Neulobeda was built southwest of Lobeda, with around 20,000 inhabitants. To better differentiate it from Neulobeda (also a district of Jena), the old Lobeda has been calling itself Lobeda-Old Town (district of Jena) since May 25, 1998.

== Geography and Traffic ==
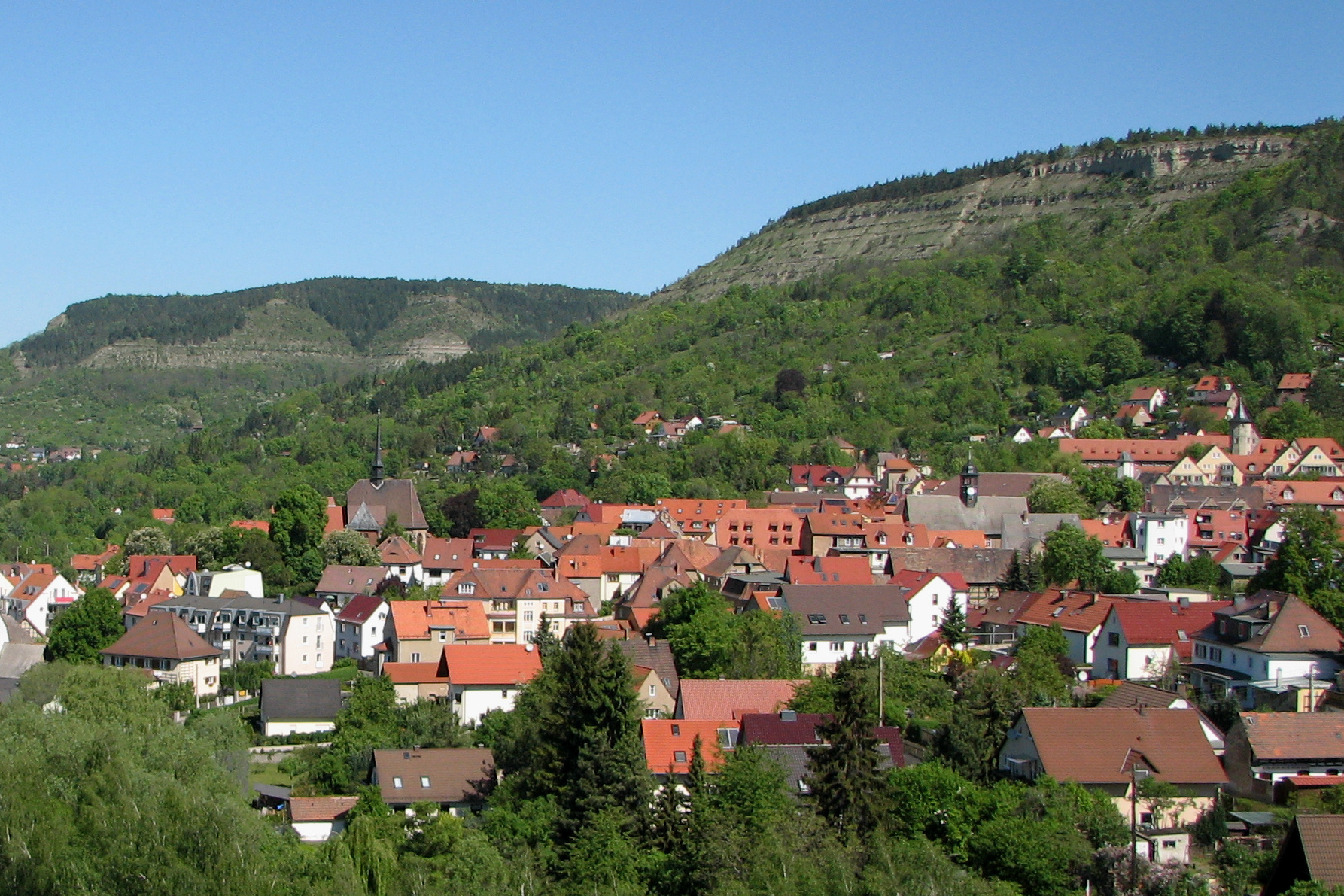
Panorama to Lobeda from Johannisberg

Geographical Location Lobeda is located in the middle of the Saale valley, between partly mixed forest-covered shell limestone and colorful sandstone slopes. The settlement area extends between 150 and 220 m above sea level above the Saale floodplain. The heights above Lobeda rise about 220 m above the valley floor, reaching 373 m on Johannisberg and 374 m on Spitzberg, forming the Saale-side edge of the Wöllmisse plateau.

=== The district of Lobeda ===
The district of the historic town of Lobeda has essentially been preserved and, in addition to the district of Lobeda-Altstadt, also covers large parts of Neulobeda. Apart from minor deviations, it is limited by the Saale, the Pennickenbach up to the Fürstenbrunnen, the Sommerlinde, the Lobdeburgklause (the Lobdeburg ruins belong to the Drackendorf area), the south-eastern border of the clinic, today's Mediamarkt and the Roda up to the mouth of the Saale. The settlement areas of Wöllnitz and Rutha are left out. The neighboring districts of Jena are Göschwitz, Burgau, Wöllnitz and Drackendorfand the municipality of Sulza, district of Rutha in the Saale-Holzland district. The deserted village of Selzdorf also belongs to the district of Lobeda.

=== Traffic ===
Lobeda-Altstadt is located on the BAB 4, 1700 m from exit no. 54 (Jena-Zentrum) and on the federal highway 88 . The nearest train station is Jena-Göschwitz (1300 m) with connections in the direction of Erfurt, Halle, Leipzig, Gera and Saalfeld. Lobeda old town is connected to the surrounding area by public transport with bus lines: Stadtroda-Tälerdörfer-Hermsdorf; Ilmnitz-Bobeck-Hermsdorf and Stadtroda-Neustadt/Orla and Schleiz. Local transport to Jena is via tram lines 4 and 5.

== History ==
=== Political Affiliation of Lobeda ===
With the first documentary appearance of Lobeda in the 12th/13th century, Lobeda belonged to the territory of the noble family of the Lobdeburgers, who came from southern Germany and had their first seat in Thuringia at the Lobdeburg. As a result of the Vogtland War of 1354–1357, Lobeda came into the hands of the Wettins in 1358. With the Leipzig division of the Wettin total state in 1485, Lobeda came to the Ernestine Electorate of Saxony. In the division of the Ernestine state of 1572, Lobeda came to the newly formed Duchy of Saxony-Weimar (Ernestine line of the Wettins). In a state division of the Duchy of Saxony-Weimar, Lobeda moved between 1672 and 1690 to the briefly existing Duchy of Saxony-Jena and then came to Saxony-Eisenach. The Saxony-Eisenach line died out in 1741, so the territory with Lobeda fell back to Saxony-Weimar (Saxony-Weimar-Eisenach). After the Congress of Vienna in 1815, the Duchy of Saxony-Weimar-Eisenach became a Grand Duchy. Lobeda remained in the Grand Duchy until the dissolution of the territorial states in 1919. From 1920, Lobeda belonged to the newly formed state of Thuringia and was temporarily (1922 to 1924) incorporated into Jena. Until 1946, Lobeda belonged to the Stadtroda district, and then permanently to Jena as a suburb of Jena-Lobeda (since 1998 Lobeda-Old Town).

=== Prehistory and Town Founding ===
Original Parish Evidence of early settlement comes from finds in the Steinchen field (eastern part of the former castle park) from 1928, which were assigned to the late Bronze Age (around 1000 BC).

In 1936, graves from the 3rd to 4th century were uncovered in the Arpersche gravel pit, and in 1965, graves of the corded ware culture (around 2500 BC) were cut into during the development of Neulobeda.

These finds show that Lobeda and its surroundings were at least temporarily settled early on.

Furthermore, Johannisberg is important for the settlement of Lobeda. There are the remains of two significant fortifications from the late Bronze Age and the early Middle Ages. The latter is interpreted both as Slavic and as a Frankish facility, which allegedly lost its importance in 937 with the creation of Kirchberg Castle near Jena.

Possibly the settlement of the Lobedaer Kirchberg then began and the place and the original parish of Lobeda were established.

Less in question is that the original parish of Lobeda already existed in the 10th century. This is indicated by the large territory of this original parish mentioned in a papal document in 1228, which included the subsidiaries Ammerbach, Schlöben, Jägersdorf and Gleina (Schöngleina, the vanished village Gleina near today's Vorwerk Cospoth near Oßmaritz) as well as a chapel Kirchberg and the many rent-paying places scattered over a wide area, such as Rothenstein, which are documented much earlier in some cases.

Another aspect was the establishment of a deanery Lobeda within the archdeaconate of the provostship of Naumburg, which existed alongside the other two deaneries Schkölen and Teuchern until the Reformation. However, the often-cited conclusion that the church of Lobeda was the second basilica of the Burgward Kirchberg and the associated city Lobeda (in a document of Otto II from 976: in Chirihberg basilicas duas cum villa) is not verifiable.

The name Lobeda first appeared with the mention of "Adalbert of Lovethe" in 1156 in a document of Albrecht the Bear. He was a vassal of the Count of Weimar-Orlamünde, which clearly shows that the Lobeda field was not exclusively in one hand. Also significant is the mention of the priest "Hugo of Lobeda" from 1213 in numerous documents.

In 1284, Lobeda was first mentioned as a city: "... Otto and Hartmann, the lords of Lodeburg, ... that we have given a farm, located at the very end of the alley of the city of Lobeda, which leads towards Pennicke on the upper way, ... to the nunnery in Butitz as their own, ..." This phrasing suggests that Lobeda had become a city well before 1284. However, there is no evidence for a specific date.

The origin of the name Lobeda is also unknown. Some historians try to derive it from "louba" (forest mountains, probably referring to the Wöllmisse), while others believe that the noble family of Auhausen, which called itself "von Lobdeburg" from 1166 onwards, derived the name from their former ancestral seat, the Ladenburg on the Neckar. However, this is unlikely, as the city would then also be called Lobdeburg and the suburban settlement before 1166 would have had a different name.

The noble family of Auhausen first appeared in the Lobeda region in 1133 in a document.

From 1166 this family called themselves Lords of Lobdeburg. This period also saw the construction of the Lobdeburg as a castle and residence, which is documented for 1186. The Lobdeburgers acted as colonizers in the Eastern Thuringian region and founded the cities of Jena and Lobeda as well as other places and the Roda Monastery. Lobeda was laid out as a planned city. The foundation of the city of Lobeda probably took place so that the Lobdeburgers could enhance their rule next to Jena with another city and settle craftsmen and servants at the foot of the Lobdeburg.
