= Hans Hess (museologist) =

German museum curator

Hans Hess OBE
- Born: 1907; Erfurt, Thuringia, German Empire
- Died: 1975 (aged 67–68)
- Occupations: Museum curator artist art historian industrialist

Academic work
- Discipline: Art history

Hans Hess OBE (1907–1975) was a German museum curator and art historian who worked in Leicester and York.

== Biography ==
He was born in Erfurt, the son of a successful Jewish shoe manufacturer and patron of the arts Alfred Hess and his wife Thekla Hess, née Pauson (1884–1968). The artists Feininger, Kandinsky, Klee, and Pechstein were family friends as well as people like Otto Bamberger who lived in the town where his mother was born and raised. Hans Hess attended the reform boarding schools Wickersdorf Free School Community and Schule am Meer where he also got confronted with a rich variety of expressionist arts, artists like Christian Rohlfs, their paintings and art historians like Walter Kaesbach.

Hess worked for the publisher Ullstein until 1933, when he was forced out for being Jewish. He moved to London in 1935 and co-founded the Inside Nazi Germany magazine and, in 1938, helped to launch the Free German League of Culture. He was interned on the Isle of Man as an 'enemy alien' before being deported to Canada. Hess returned to Britain in 1942.

In early 1944 he was appointed Assistant Keeper of Art under the director Trevor Thomas (1907–1993) to Leicester Museum and Art Gallery just before the opening of an exhibition, which ran from 5–27 February 1944, titled 'Mid-European Art', which was supported by the Free German League of Culture. Hess was promoted to Keeper of Art following Thomas' sudden and forced departure in 1946. Later, he was appointed curator at York Art Gallery in 1948, when the gallery reopened after being bombed during the Second World War. He lived with his wife (and fellow German refugee) Lillie Williams and their daughter Anita at 56 Skeldergate in York.

He was awarded an OBE in the 1958 New Year Honours.

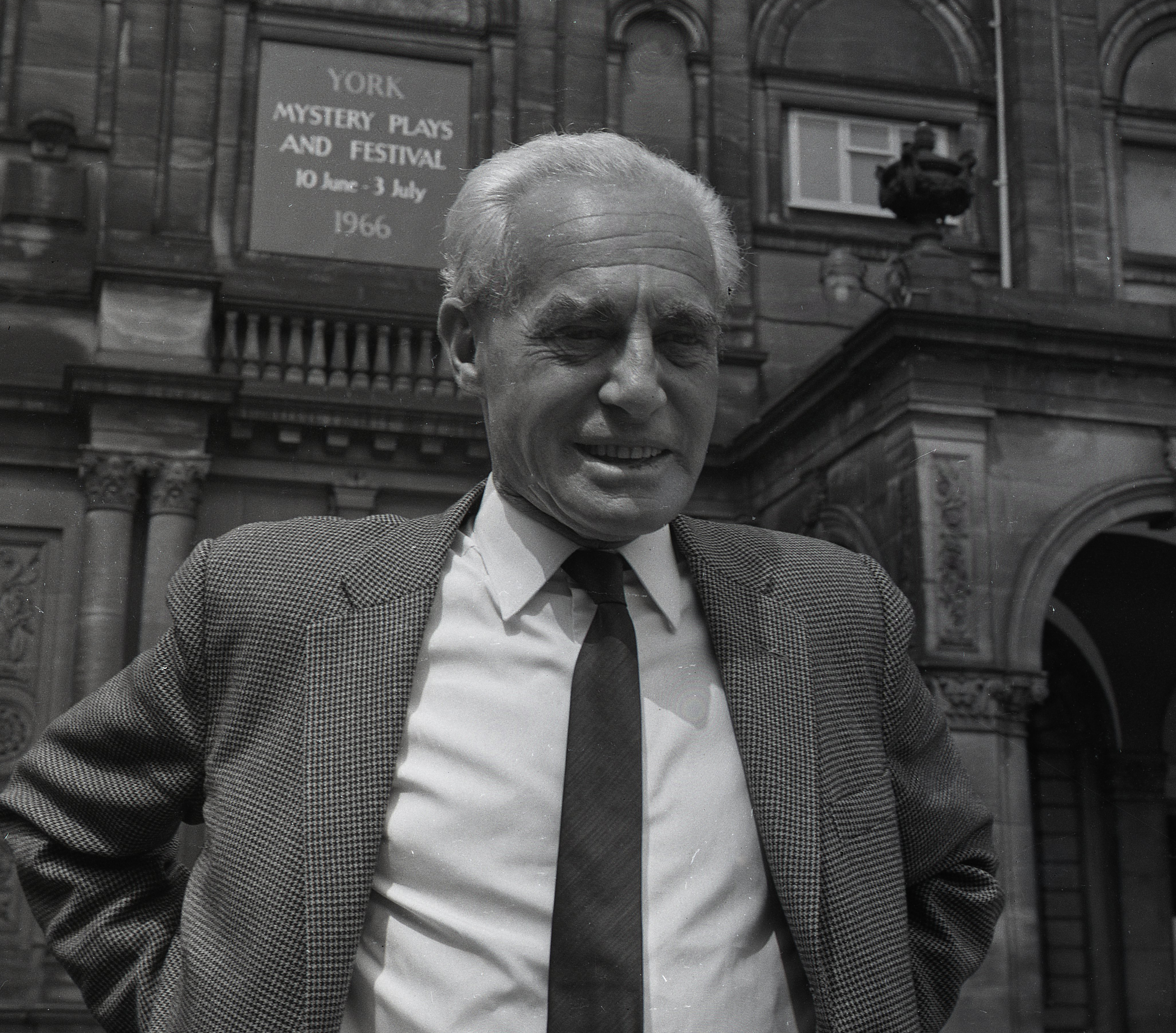
Hans Hess preparing for the Mystery plays outside York Art Gallery, 1966

During his time in York he was artistic director of the York Festival in 1954, 1957, 1960, 1963, and 1966. He left York in 1967 to take up a post with the University of Sussex after a public altercation with Jack Wood, a York councillor, regarding the programme for the 1966 Festival.

Throughout his life Hess was an active Marxist and contributed articles to Marxism Today, the theoretical magazine of the Communist Party of Great Britain.

At the University of Sussex he was Reader in the history and theory of art.

In 2010 he was the subject of a Sheldon Memorial Trust Lecture by John Ingamells.

== Select publications ==
- Hess, H. 1959. Lyonel Feininger. Stuttgart, Kohlhammer Verlag.
- Hess, H. 1963. George Grosz, 1893–1959. London, Arts Council.
- Hess, H. 1964. The artist in an industrial society. Hull, University of Hull.

• Hess, H. 1975. Pictures as Arguments, London, Chatto and Windus for the University of Sussex Press.
