= Karl Feininger =

German-American violinist and composer

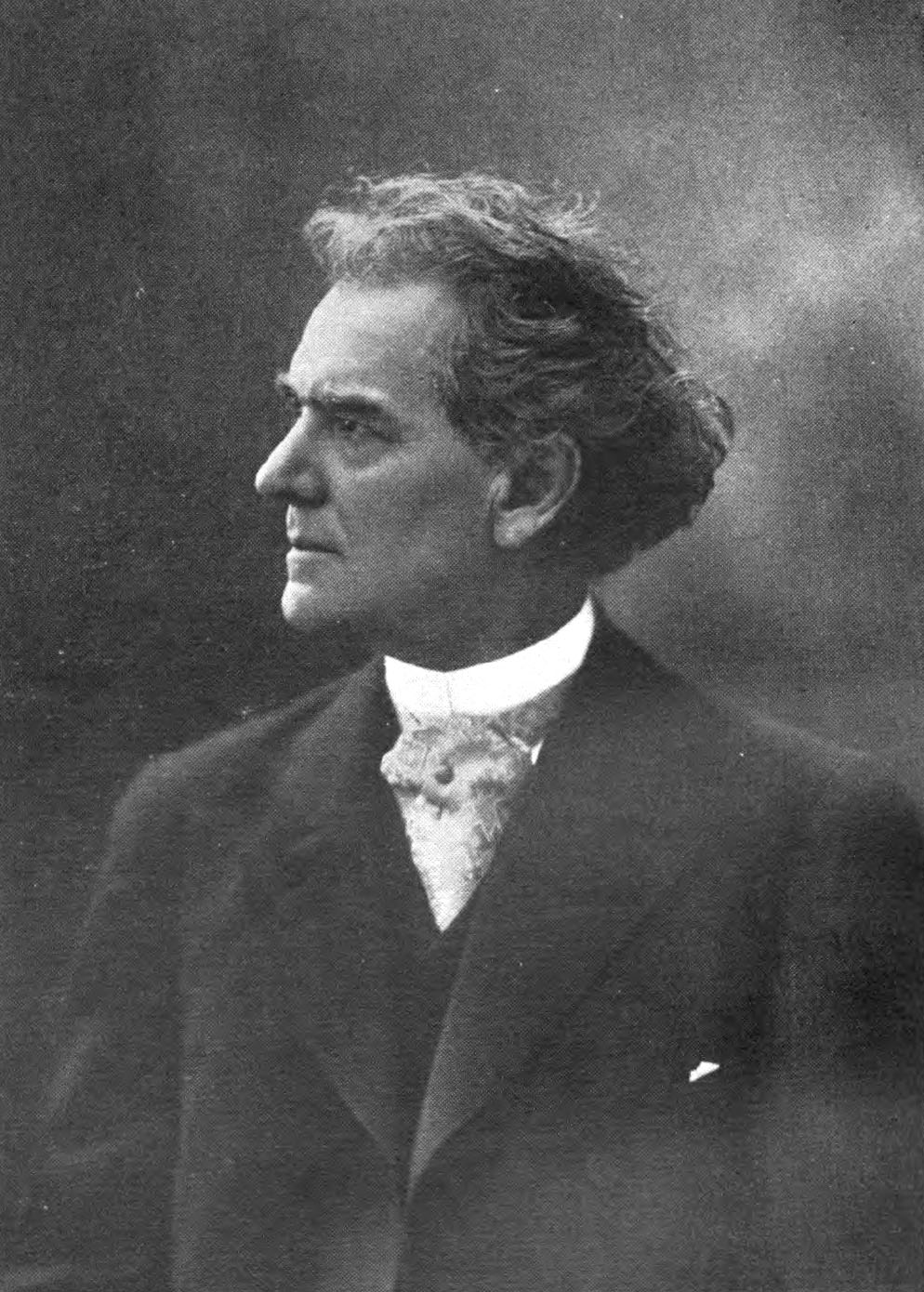
- Born: 31 July 1844; Durlach, Grand Duchy of Baden
- Died: 31 January 1922 (aged 77); New York City, US
- Children: Lyonel Feininger
- Musical career
- Instrument: Violin

Karl Wilhelm Friedrich Feininger (31 July 1844 – 31 January 1922) was a German–American musician.

== Biography ==
Feininger came to the United States with his parents in 1853. They settled in Columbia, South Carolina. Feininger was educated in St. Mary's College there. He displayed a talent for music, and was placed with August Koepper for instruction. He made his debut at 14, playing the violin part of a Beethoven trio (Op. 70, No. 2). Afterward, he studied music in the Leipzig Conservatory in Germany where he studied with Ferdinand David. He led an orchestra in 1863. He returned to the United States in 1864 when the Civil War was in progress, and enlisted in the Union Army, serving under General Gillmore until the war ended.

After the war, he taught music, and also made his first appearance in New York as a violin soloist in 1867. In 1874, he traveled through South America on an extended tour, where he met with success as a violinist. In 1886, he made his debut as a composer in Berlin. His first concert of 7 October included his "Academische" overture (1866), his "Narciss" overture (1868), a symphony (op. 12, highly praised by Franz Liszt; 1870), and "Emotive Pictures" (1885). In 1887, his symphonies, suites and symphonic poems were performed in Berlin by an orchestra under the direction of Benjamin Bilse. Feininger's compositions also included choruses with orchestral accompaniment, and many songs in English and German. He also started an opera, "Die Brüder." After a concert tour through many of the capitals of Europe, he returned to the United States and devoted himself to concert work and teaching.

Feininger developed a new mode of teaching the piano, "based upon absolute knowledge of human character." He was head of the music department of the Low and Heywood School for Girls of Stamford, Connecticut, for 32 years. He was the author of An experiential psychology of music (1909).

Feininger's manuscript diary for 1911–1913, which is in Manuscripts Division of the New York Public Library, reveals a man given to bitter racial denunciations of blacks, especially of the cooks he and his wife hired and fired, and to a deep attachment to the New Thought religious movement, which also motivated Feininger to draft a dozen chapters for a book denouncing the founder of Christian Science, Mary Baker Eddy, as an "ignoramus" and fraud. The book never was published, although some fragments of it may be contained in the papers of his son Lyonel Feininger, the German Expressionist painter, at Harvard University's Houghton Library.

He was survived by his second wife, Jane Pottinger Feininger, a pianist and accompanist who toured with him until 1910. For several years, she was the piano accompanist of the London Handel Society. He was also survived by a son from his first marriage, Lyonel Feininger, a noted painter.

== Publications ==
- An experiential psychology of music. New York City: August Gemünder & Sons. 1909.
