= Lyonel Feininger =

German-American painter (1871-1956)

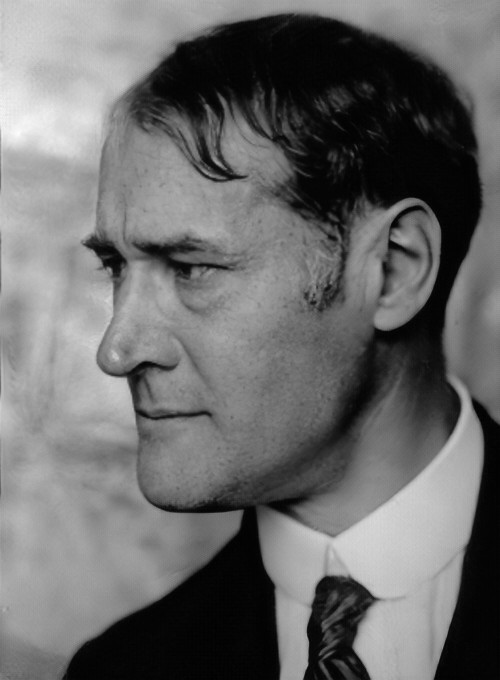
- Lyonel Feininger 1941
- Born: July 17, 1871; New York City, U.S.
- Died: January 13, 1956 (aged 84); New York City, U.S.
- Known for: Painting, Cartoonist, Photography
- Movement: Expressionism, Cubism, Blaue Reiter, Die Brücke, Berlin Secession, Novembergruppe
- Spouse: Julia Feininger (m. 1908)
- Elected: American Academy of Arts and Letters (1955)

Lyonel Charles Adrian Feininger (/ˈfaɪnɪŋər/; July 17, 1871 – January 13, 1956) was a German-American painter, and a leading exponent of Expressionism. He also worked as a caricaturist and comic strip artist. He was born and grew up in New York City. In 1887 he traveled to Europe and studied art in Hamburg, Berlin and Paris. He started his career as a cartoonist in 1894 and met with much success in this area. He also worked as a commercial caricaturist for 20 years. At the age of 36, he began to work as a fine artist. His work, characterized above all by prismatically broken, overlapping forms in translucent colors, with many references to architecture and the sea, made him one of the most important artists of classical modernism. Furthermore he produced a large body of photographic works and created several piano compositions and fugues for organ.

== Life and work ==
Lyonel Feininger, 1914, Benz VI, oil on canvas, 100 × 125 cm (39.3 × 49.2 in)

Lyonel Feininger, 1924, Gaberndorf II, oil on canvas mounted on board, (39 7/16 × 30 3/4 in) Included in Nelson-Atkins Museum of Art, 46-10

Lyonel Feininger was born to German-American violinist and composer Karl Feininger and American singer Elizabeth Feininger. He was born and grew up in New York City. In 1887 he traveled to Germany at the age of 16 to study music, but switched to study drawing at the Hamburger Gewerbeschule. In 1888, he moved to Berlin and studied at the Königliche Akademie der Künste, Berlin under Ernst Hancke. He continued his studies at art schools in Berlin with Adolf Schlabitz, and in Paris with sculptor Filippo Colarossi. He began working as a caricaturist. He worked for several magazines, including Harper's Round Table, Harper's Young People, Humoristische Blätter, Lustige Blätter, Das Narrenschiff, Berliner Tageblatt and Ulk.

In 1900, he met Clara Fürst, daughter of the painter Gustav Fürst. He married her in 1901, and they had two daughters. In 1905, he separated from his wife after meeting Julia Berg. He married Berg in 1908 and the couple had three sons.

The artist was represented with drawings at the exhibitions of the annual Berlin Secession in the years 1901 through 1903.

Feininger's career as cartoonist began in 1894. He was working for several German, French and American magazines. In February 1906, when a quarter of Chicago's population was of German descent, James Keeley, editor of The Chicago Tribune traveled to Germany to procure the services of the most popular humor artists. He recruited Feininger to illustrate two comic strips "The Kin-der-Kids" and "Wee Willie Winkie's World" for the Chicago Tribune. The strips were noted for their fey humor and graphic experimentation. He also worked as a commercial caricaturist for 20 years for various newspapers and magazines in the United States, Germany, and France. Later, Art Spiegelman wrote in The New York Times Book Review, that Feininger's comics have "achieved a breathtaking formal grace unsurpassed in the history of the medium."

Feininger started working as a fine artist at the age of 36. He was a member of the Berliner Sezession in 1909, and he was associated with German expressionist groups: Die Brücke, the Novembergruppe, Gruppe 1919, the Blaue Reiter circle and Die Blaue Vier (The Blue Four). His first solo exhibit was at Sturm Gallery in Berlin, 1917. When Walter Gropius founded the Bauhaus in Germany in 1919, Feininger was his first faculty appointment, and became the master artist in charge of the printmaking workshop.

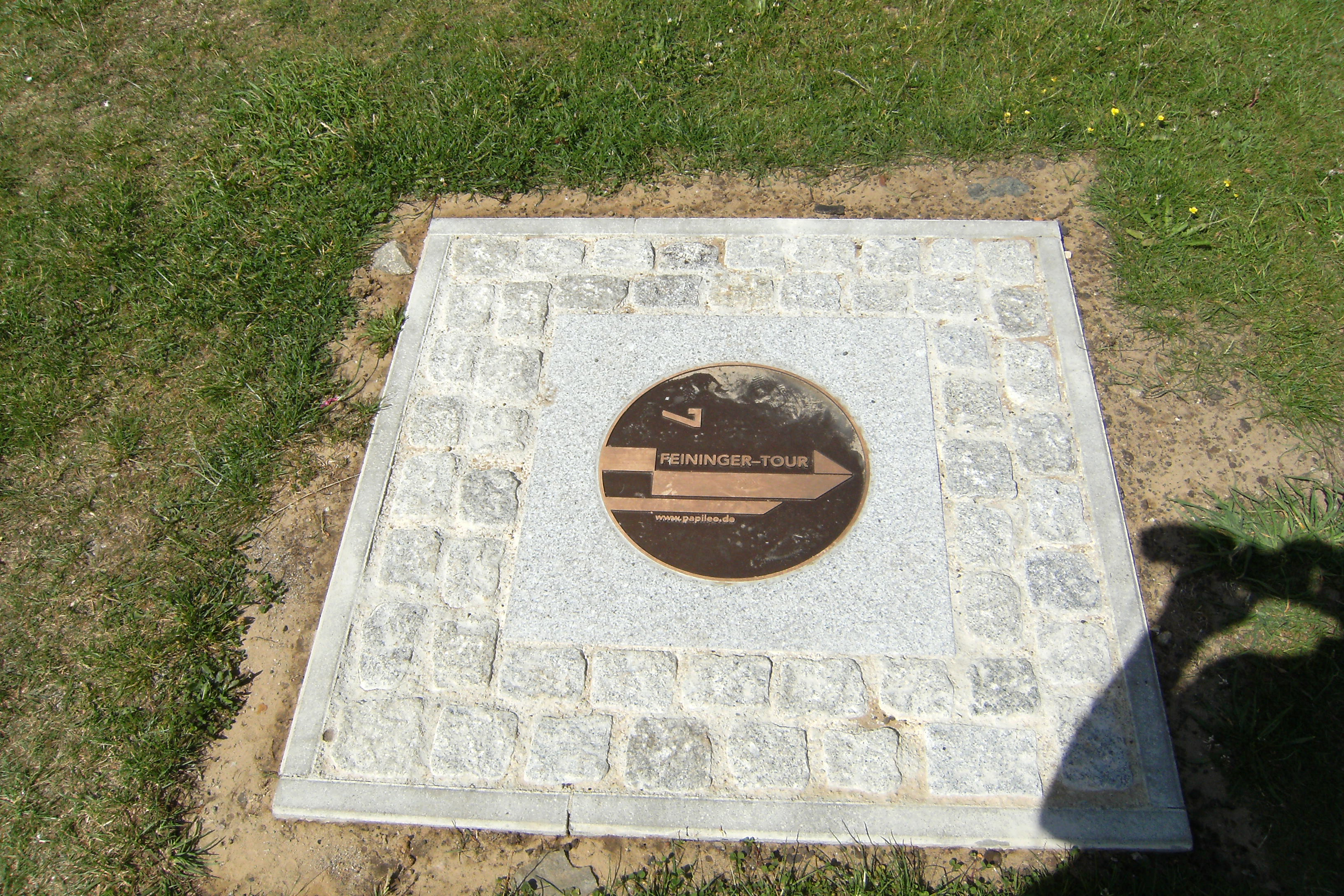
Feininger Tour marker in Benz, Usedom Island, Germany

From 1909 until 1918, Feininger spent summer vacations on the island of Usedom to recover and to get new inspiration. Typical of works from this period were marine settings from the shores of the Baltic See (Ostsee). He continued to create paintings and drawings of Benz for the rest of his life, even after returning to live in the United States. A tour of the sites appearing in the works of Feininger follows a path with markers in the ground to guide visitors.

He designed the cover for the Bauhaus 1919 manifesto: an expressionist woodcut 'cathedral'. He taught at the Bauhaus for several years. Among the students who attended his workshops were Ludwig Hirschfeld Mack (German/Australian (1893–1965), Hans Friedrich Grohs (German 1892 – 1981), and Margarete Koehler-Bittkow (German/American, 1898–1964).

When the Nazi Party came to power in 1933, the situation became unbearable for Feininger and his wife. The Nazi Party declared his work to be "degenerate". They moved to America after his work was exhibited in the 'degenerate art' (Entartete Kunst) in 1936, but before the 1937 exhibition in Munich. He taught at Mills College before returning to New York. He was elected to the American Academy of Arts and Letters in 1955.

In addition to drawing, painting, woodcutting, and printmaking, Feininger created art with painted toy figures being photographed in front of drawn backgrounds.

Feininger produced a large body of photographic works between 1928 – he was then already 58 years old – and the mid-1950s. He then lived and taught in Dessau, where his neighbor was the famous experimental photographer László Moholy-Nagy, who encouraged him. He kept his photographic work within his circle of friends, and it was not shared with the public in his lifetime. He gave some prints away to his colleagues Walter Gropius and Alfred H. Barr Jr.

Feininger also had intermittent activity as a pianist and composer, with several piano compositions and fugues for organ extant. In tandem with the Whitney retrospective, the American Symphony Orchestra under Leon Botstein, at Carnegie Hall on 21 October 2011, performed three orchestral fugues written by Feininger. Barbara Haskell, curator of the Whitney exhibit, wrote that for his entire life, Feininger credited Bach with having been his "master in painting."

His sons, Andreas Feininger and T. Lux Feininger, both became noted artists, the former as a photographer and the latter as a photographer and painter. T. Lux Feininger died July 7, 2011, at the age of 101.

== Major retrospectives ==
A major retrospective exhibition of Lyonel Feininger's work was put on in 2011–2012: Lyonel Feininger: At the Edge of the World opened initially at the Whitney Museum of American Art, June 30 through October 16, 2011, subsequently at the Montreal Museum of Fine Arts, January 1 through May 13, 2012. The exhibition is described as "the first in Feininger's native country in more than forty-five years, and the first ever to include the full breadth of his art" and as "accompanied by a richly illustrated monograph with a feature essay that provides a broad overview of Feininger's career..." Many critics have argued that the artist's work was at its most mature around 1910 in works in which the power of Feininger as illustrator balance his abstract side; however, we have to consider the possibility that Feininger used Cubism as a more artistically succinct tool to establish his version of the concept known as the objective correlative.

An important retrospective exhibition of Lyonel Feininger's photographic work took place Germany and the USA in 2011–2012, from Berlin (Kupferstichkabinett, Staatliche Museen) to Cambridge, Massachusetts (Busch-Reisinger Museum), through Munich (Pinakothek der Moderne) and Los Angeles (J. Paul Getty Museum).

From February 17 – May 28, 2017, the Fundación Juan March Madrid, Spain exhibited Lyonel Feininger (1871-1956), the first exhibition of his work in Spain. The "concentrated retrospective" included 399 of Feininger's works including painting, photography and model trains. A smaller version of the exhibit, Lyonel Feininger. Comics, Toys, Drawings and Paintings, was shown at the Museu Fundación Juan March Palma from 14 June - 14 October 2017.

From 29 January - 18 June 2023, the Santa Barbara Museum of Art exhibited Lyonel Feininger/Andreas Feininger: The Modern Sea, The Modern City: Prints, Drawings, and Photographs from the Collection. The “exhibition compares and contrasts the visions of these two artists who depicted similar elements of their different worlds in entirely different media, but with the same effect of uniquely contributing to the advance of 20th-century Modernism and its forms and ideas.”

From October 27, 2023 – February 18, 2024, the Schirn Kunsthalle Frankfurt, Frankfurt am Main, displayed Lyonel Feininger. Retrospective; in addition to paintings and watercolors, the exhibit included Feininger’s photographs, graphic works and caricatures.

== In popular culture ==
In Robert M. Pirsig's Zen and the Art of Motorcycle Maintenance (1974) the narrator finds a print of Feininger's "Church of the Minorites" hanging in the office that used to be his in his earlier life as Phaedrus. He writes that his friend "had frowned because it was a print and prints are of art and not art themselves [...] But the print had an appeal to him that was irrelevant to the art in that the subject, a kind of Gothic cathedral, created from semiabstract lines and planes and colors and shades, seemed to reflect his mind's vision of the Church of Reason and that was why he'd put it here." Finding the print jolts loose "an avalanche of memory" of the very place his madness started.

== Art market ==
At a 2001 Christie's auction in London, Feininger's painting The Green Bridge (1909) was sold for £2.42 million.

At a 2007 Sotheby's auction in New York, Feininger's oil painting "Jesuits III" (1915) sold for $23,280,000.

At a 2017 Sotheby's auction in New York, Feininger's oil painting Fin de séance (1910) sold for $5,637,500.

== Selected works ==
- 1907, Der weiße Mann, (Collection Museo Carmen Thyssen-Bornemisza, Madrid)
- 1910, Straße im Dämmern, (Sprengel Museum, Hannover)
- 1913, Gelmeroda I, (Private collection, New York)
- 1913, Leuchtbake, (Museum Folkwang, Essen, Germany)
- 1916, Grüne Brücke II (Green Bridge II), (North Carolina Museum of Art, Raleigh)
- 1918, Teltow II, (Neue Nationalgalerie, Berlin)
- 1918, "Yellow Streets II", (Musée des Beaux-Arts de Montréal, Montréal)
- 1920, Ostsee-Segelboote II, (Private collection, Wichita, KS)
- 1922, Church of Heiligenhafen, (Reynolda House Museum of American Art, Winston-Salem, NC)
- 1925, Barfüßerkirche in Erfurt I, (Staatsgalerie Stuttgart)
- 1926, Barfüßerkirche II (Church of the Minorites II)
- 1929, Halle, Am Trödel, (Bauhaus-Archive, Berlin)
- 1931, Die Türme über der Stadt (Halle), (Museum Ludwig, Köln)
- 1931, Der Dom in Halle, (Kunstmuseum Moritzburg, Halle (Saale))
- 1936, Gelmeroda XIII, (Metropolitan Museum of Art, New York)
- 1940, The River, (Worcester Art Museum, MA)

== See also ==
- Museum Lyonel Feininger
