= Sam Salz =

Sam Salz may refer to:

- Sam Salz (American football), American football player
- Sam Salz (art dealer), art dealer
