= Female Half-Length Nude with Hat =

Painting by Ernst Ludwig Kirchner

- Weiblicher Halbakt mit Hut (German)
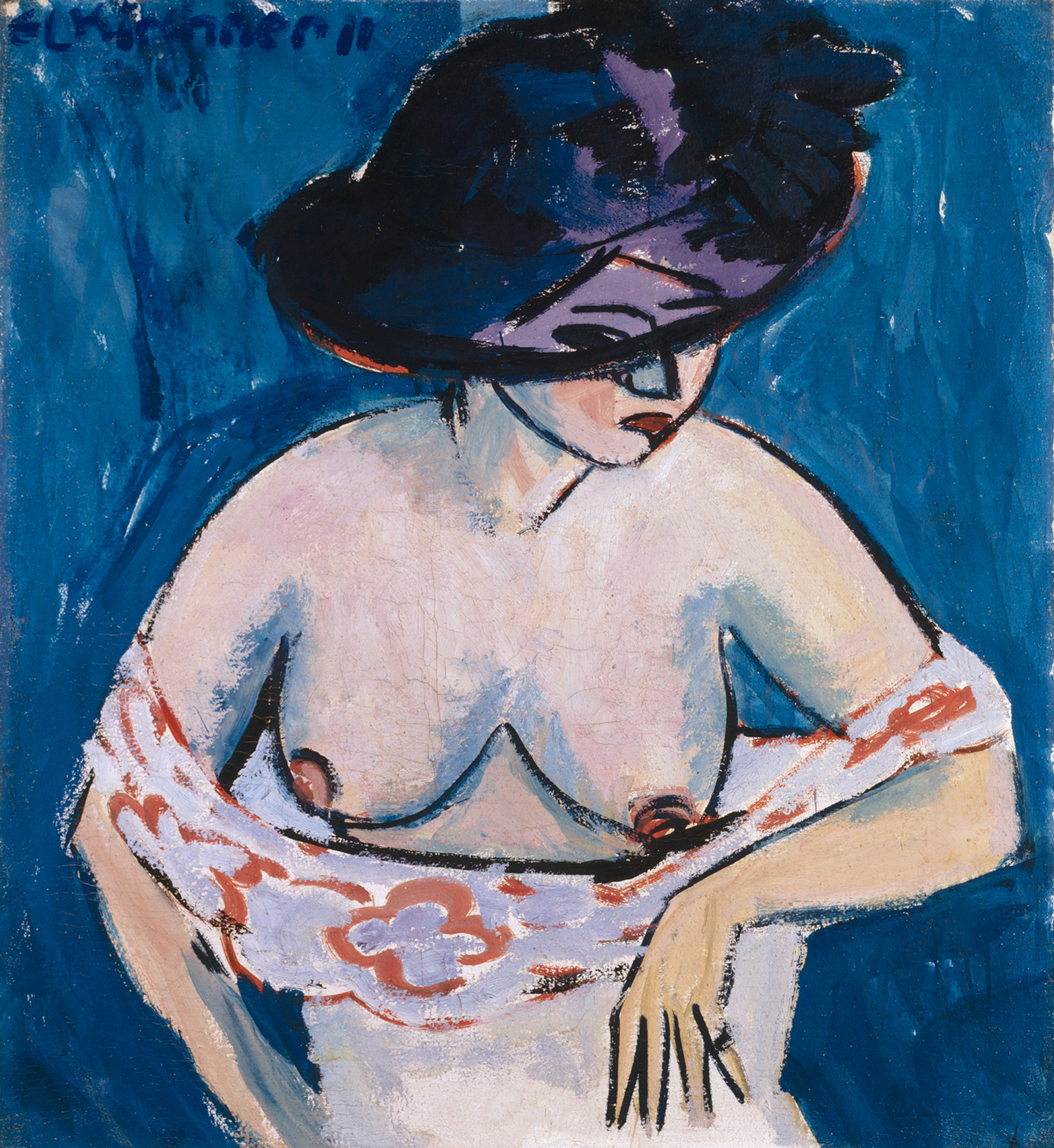
- Artist: Ernst Ludwig Kirchner
- Year: 1911
- Medium: Oil on canvas
- Dimensions: 76 cm × 70 cm (30 in × 28 in)
- Location: Museum Ludwig, Cologne

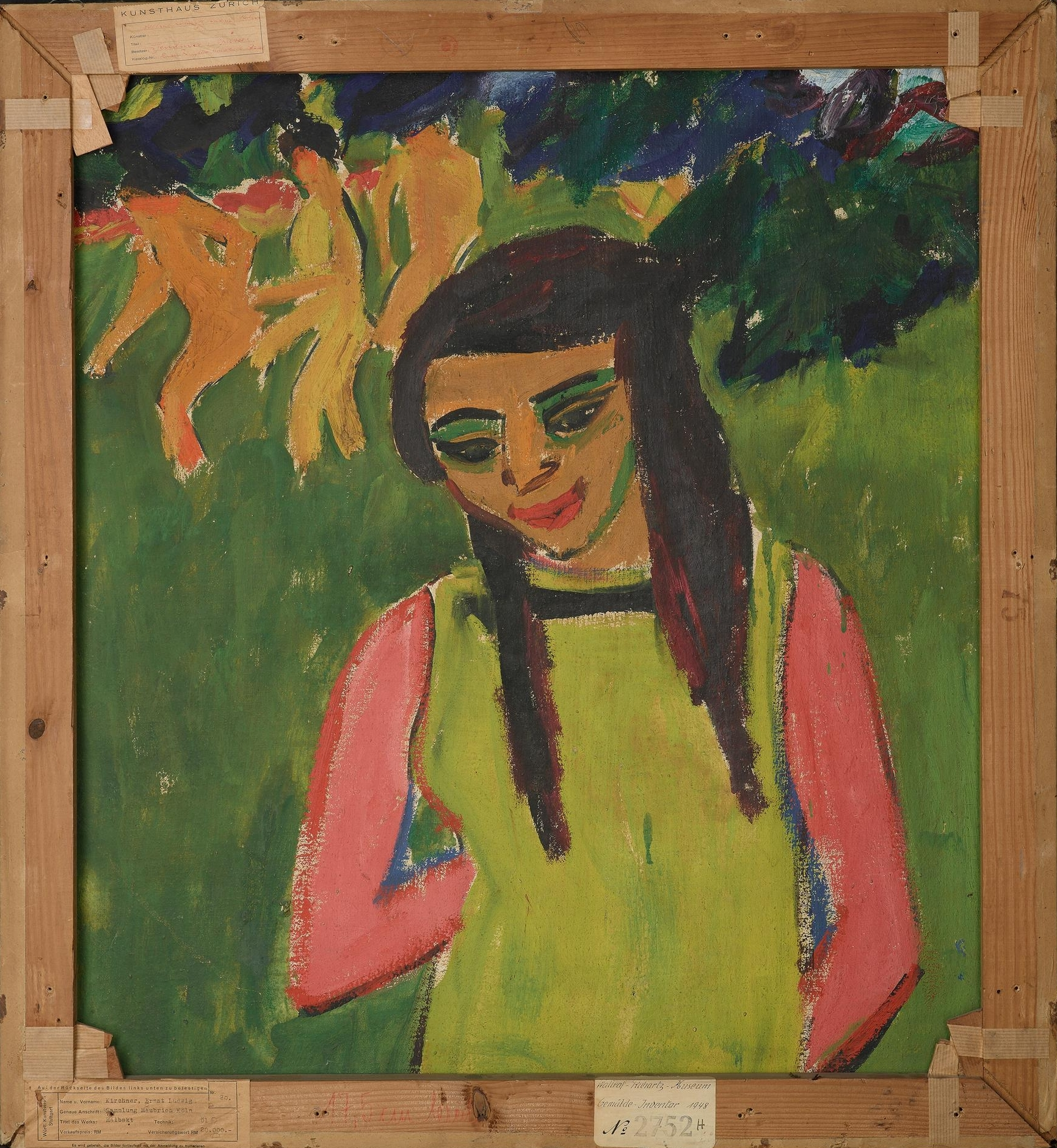
The reverse of the painting: Fränzi and the Bathers

Female Half-Length Nude with Hat (German: Weiblicher Halbakt mit Hut) is an 1911 oil on canvas painting by the German Expressionist painter Ernst Ludwig Kirchner. It is currently held at the Museum Ludwig in Cologne.

== History and description ==
The work depicts Kirchner's lover and model Doris Große, known as "Dodo". The pair met in Dresden around 1903 or 1904, maintaining a relationship until 1911 when Kirchner moved from Dresden to Berlin. Dodo was a milliner who designed extravagant ladies’ hats which frequently appeared in Kirchner's portraits. In this work, she is shown partially undressed, wearing a hat, and with a distant look.

Stylistically, the painting reflects the influences of French Fauvism with its restrained color palette and sparse line work . The motif of a beautiful woman wearing a hat frequently appeared in Fauvists works, for example, in the paintings of Alexej von Jawlensky. However, Kirchner’s painting also contains elements of his engagement with non-European art. In contrast to the passive sensuality seen in the nudes of Henri Matisse (e.g. Blue Nude (Souvenir de Biskra)), Kirchner’s woman adopts a more tense, self-aware posture–a posture he knew from depictions of the Indian wall paintings at Ajanta. The painting also marks a shift from Kirchner's previous two-dimensional style toward a more sculptural effect.

Painted on the reverse of the canvas is the unfinished Fränzi and Bathers from 1910, which depicts muse and child model of the Brücke artists, Lina Franziska Fehrmann, known as Fränzi.

== Provenance ==
The painting was originally part of the Adolphe Basler collection in Paris and was later acquired by the American art dealer Sam Salz who was living in Paris at the time. In 1924, the work came to Cologne as part of the collection of the lawyer Josef Haubrich. It survived the Nazi era there and was donated to the Wallraf-Richartz Museum in Cologne in 1946, along with the entire Haubrich collection. The painting remained in the museum until 1976 when it was transferred to the newly established Museum Ludwig. Since 1922, the work has been shown in numerous international exhibitions as a definitive example of Kirchner’s Expressionist style.
