= Radomyśl Wielki =

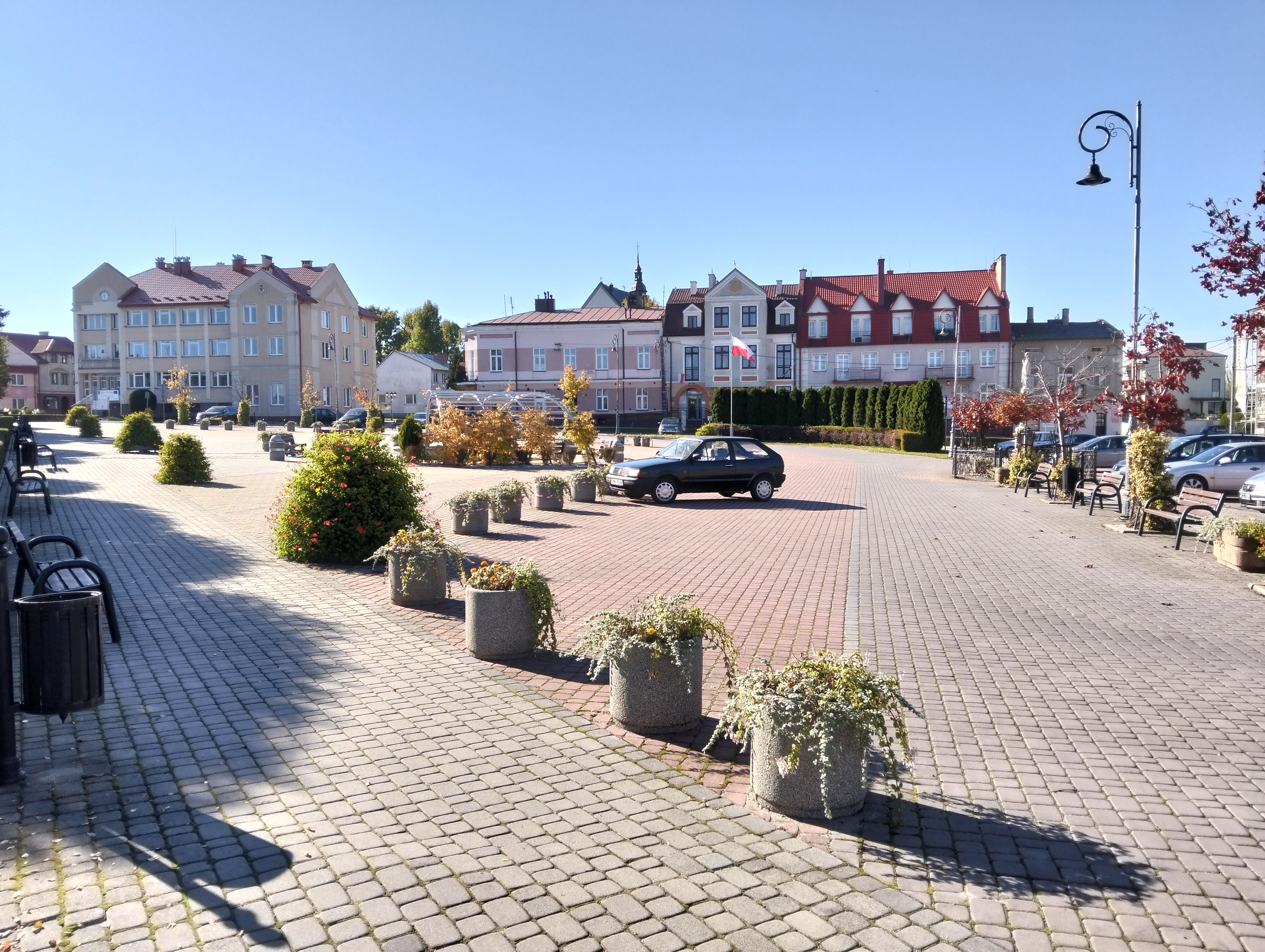
- Market square

- Coat of arms

- Location within Poland
- Coordinates: 50°11′41″N 21°16′24″E
- Country: Poland
- Voivodeship: Subcarpathian
- County: Mielec
- Gmina: Radomyśl Wielki

Government
  - Mayor: Agnieszka Machnik (PiS)

Area
  - Total: 8.38 km^{2} (3.24 sq mi)

Population (2019)
  - Total: 3,231
  - Density: 386/km^{2} (999/sq mi)
- Time zone: UTC+1 (CET)
  - Summer (DST): UTC+2 (CEST)
- Postal code: 39-310
- Website: http://www.radomyslwielki.pl/

Radomyśl Wielki (Polish pronunciation: [raˈdɔmɨɕl ˈvjɛlkʲi]) is a town in the Subcarpathian Voivodeship (Mielec County), Poland, with a population of 3,231 inhabitants (30.06.2019). The town lies on a local road nr. 984, running between Tarnów and Mielec and within the historic borders of Lesser Poland (not to be confused with the modern Subcarpathian Voivodeship, within whose boundaries it also lies).

== History ==
On January 31, 1581, King Stefan Batory allowed Mikołaj Firlej, the starosta of Biecz, to grant Magdeburg rights to the town of Radomyśl, located on the territory of villages Dulcza and Ruda. The area of Radomyśl had since the 14th century belonged to the Ligęza noble family (Półkozic coat of arms). After the wedding of Elżbieta Ligęza with Mikołaj Firlej, Radomyśl passed as a dowry into the hands of the Firlej family. In the late 16th century, the town had a parish church, which burned in 1646. New church was funded by the Firlejs, but it was not completed until 1740. Radomyśl also had a hospital and a parish school, and belonged to Lesser Poland’s Sandomierz Voivodeship (province).

The town was burned and looted in the Swedish invasion of Poland (Deluge), and it never recovered from the destruction of 1655–60. In the 18th century, first Jews settled here, and after the Partitions of Poland, Radomyśl found itself in the Austrian province of Galicia (1772–1918). In the mid-19th century, local peasants took part in the Galician slaughter, and during the January Uprising, residents of the town supported Polish rebels fighting in Russian-controlled Congress Poland. In the 19th century Radomyśl, located close to the Austrian - Russian border, further declined. Its population shrank, there was no industry and no prospects for the residents. The town burned several times, and the situation did not begin to slowly improve until the early 20th century. In 1907, the name of the town was changed to Radomyśl Wielki, to distinguish it from Radomyśl nad Sanem.

In September 1914, during World War I, Russian troops seized Radomyśl and their occupation lasted until May 1915, when they were pushed back by the Austrians. In the Second Polish Republic (1918–1939), Radomyśl belonged to Kraków Voivodeship. The town was a local center of commerce, with several stores and businesses. Radomyśl did not take advantage of the Central Industrial Region (Poland) in the late 1930s. No factories were built here, nevertheless, many residents moved to Dębica and Mielec in search of work. In 1934 Radomyśl regained the town charter, which it had lost in 1919.

During World War II, Germans murdered most of town’s Jewish residents. Radomyśl Wielki had its own, local Home Army unit, which in August 1944 took part in Operation Tempest. As a result of the war, the population of the town was reduced from approximately 3,000 (in 1939), to 1,156 (1945). Since 90% of houses were destroyed during the war, Radomyśl does not feature many historic buildings, except for the parish church and several tenements around the market square. Also, in the market square there is the only existing prototype of PZL M-2, Polish trainer aircraft designed in PZL Mielec.

== People ==
- Arthur Miller (1915–2005) – father born in Radomyśl Wielki.
- Sam Salz (1894–1981), art dealer, born in Radomyśl Wielki.
