= Fränzi Reclining =

Woodcut by Erich Heckel (1910)

- Fränzi liegend (German)
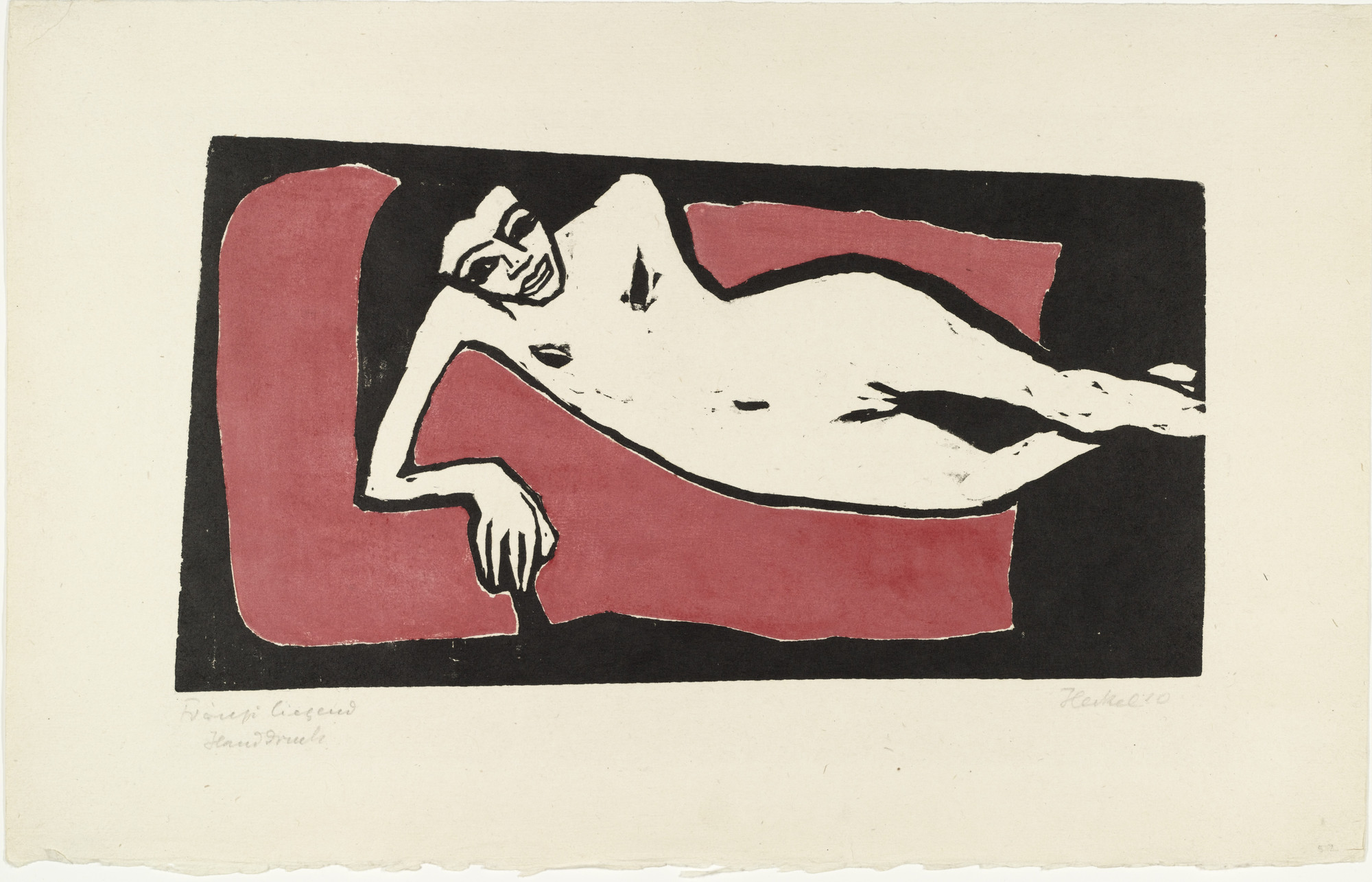
- Artist: Erich Heckel
- Year: 1910
- Medium: Woodcut
- Movement: Die Brücke, Expressionist
- Subject: Lina Franziska Fehrmann
- Dimensions: 22.7 cm × 41.9 cm (8.9 in × 16.5 in)

Fränzi Reclining (German: Fränzi liegend) is a 1910 woodcut by Erich Heckel. It features a nude girl reclining, propped up on her right arm. Her body is white, the lines black, and the background red. This work is associated with the Die Brücke and Expressionist movements. The subject and style (exaggerated mask-like features alongside strategic use of red and jarringly thick outlines) make it primitivistic as well. Heckel's return to an unrefined format through the ancient medium of woodblock printing contrasts the urban progress of the Industrial Revolution and German Unification.

== Background ==
The model, Lina Franziska Fehrmann, here referred to as Fränzi, was one of several younger people who floated around the Brücke studios. Fränzi, given her awkward yet realistic poses, was one of the group's favorite models. This print was made by carving a woodblock and then sawing it into pieces. Heckel then inked the pieces separately in red and black, and assembled them for printing. This printing technique came from Edvard Munch, whom Heckel admired. Heckel, like many primitivists, was also inspired by African and Oceanic sculptural art he saw at the Dresden Ethnographic Museum. This influence is found in his angular and mask-like rendering of Fränzi.

The print was acquired in 1948 by the Städel Museum as a donation from the heirs of the Carl Hagemann estate; in 2017 it was restituted to the heirs of Eugen Buchthal and repurchased. Donations from the Hagemann estate helped compensate from losses in 1937 during the Nazi's "Degenerate Art" campaign.
