= Kohelet Yeshiva High School =

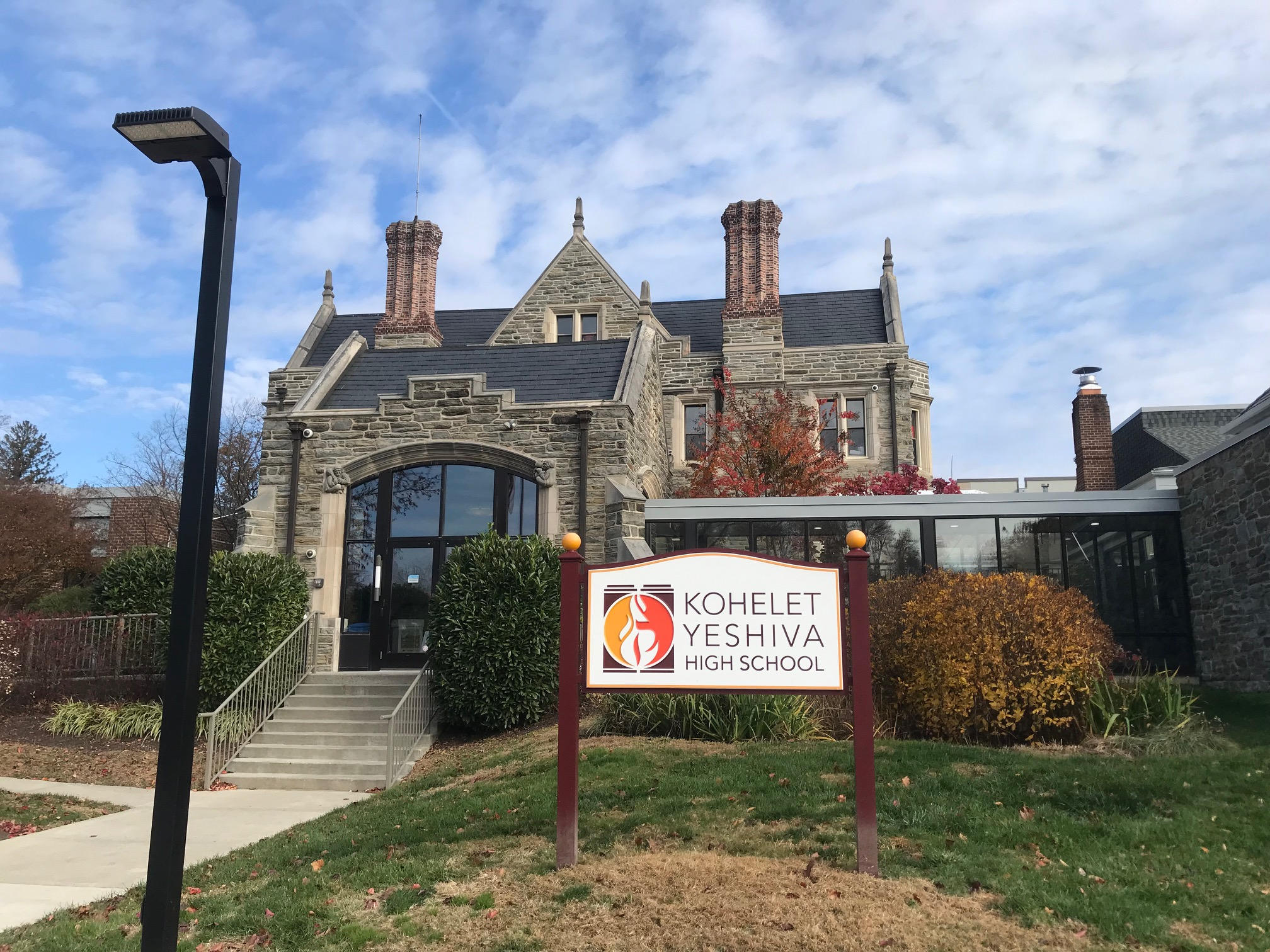
- Kohelet Yeshiva High School (November 2021)

Location
- 223 North Highland Avenue; Merion Station, Pennsylvania 19066; United States; 40°00′08″N 75°14′28″W

Information
- Type: Private high school, Yeshiva
- Established: 2000
- Head of school: Rabbi Maccabee Avishur
- Grades: K–12
- Enrollment: 354 (2024-2025)
- Campus: Suburban
- Colors: Maroon and Gold
- Nickname: Kings
- Accreditation: Pennsylvania State Board of Private Academic Schools
- Affiliation: Modern Orthodox Judaism
- Website: School website

Kohelet Yeshiva High School (Hebrew: ישיבת קהלת) is a Modern Orthodox college preparatory Jewish high school that offers a dual curriculum program of Judaic and General Studies for both boys and girls in Merion, Pennsylvania in the Philadelphia suburbs.

== History ==
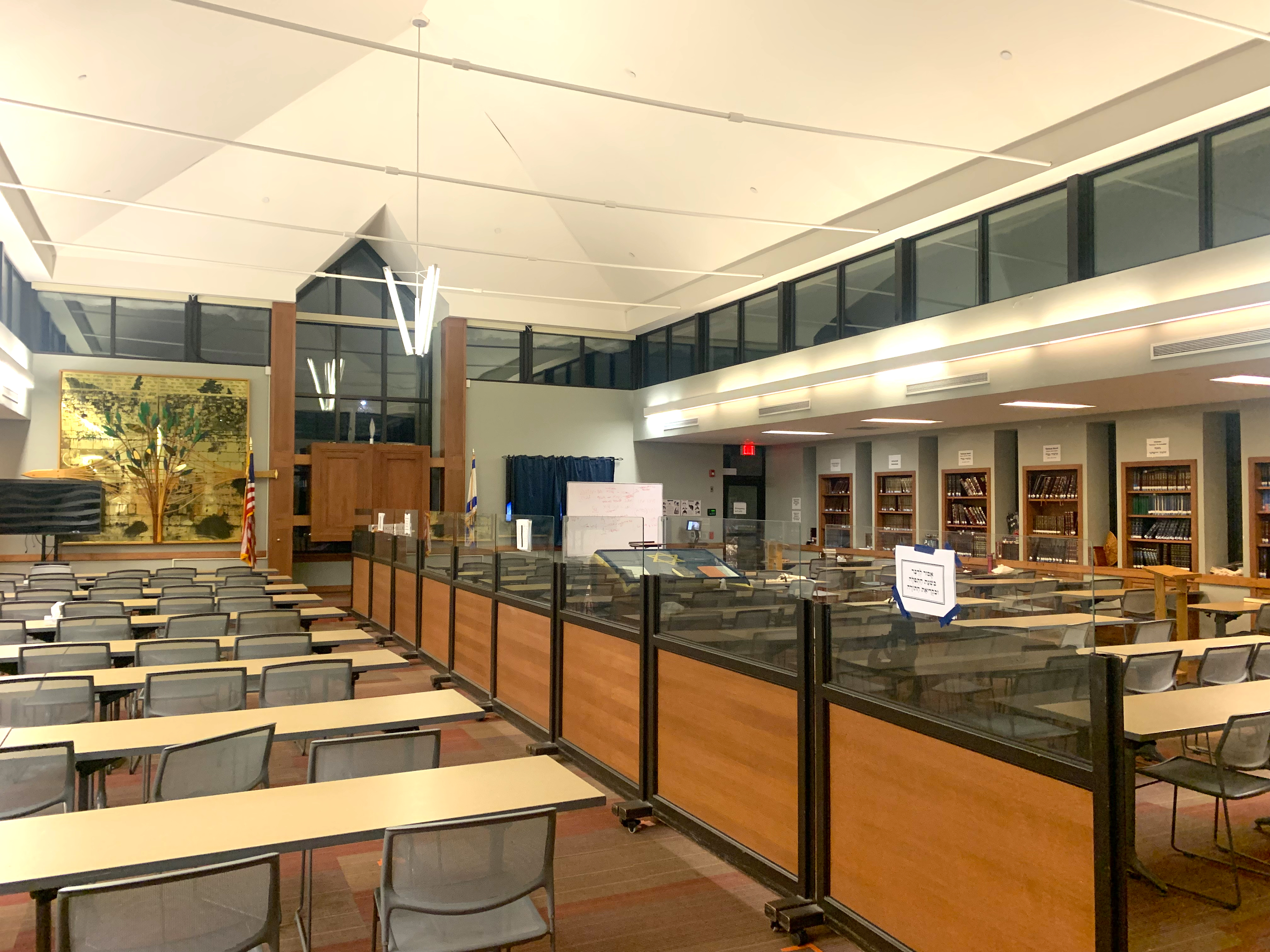
Kohelet Yeshiva High School Beit Midrash (February 2026)

Kohelet Yeshiva was founded in 2000 in Northeast Philadelphia. It was named Stern Hebrew High School after its primary funder Harry Stern. The Kohelet Foundation funded the school's relocation to its current campus in 2010 and the school renamed itself in recognition.

Barrack Hebrew Academy had occupied a 4.4-acre parcel at 233 N Highland Avenue in Merion. Its complex was constructed around a Tudor Revival mansion, built in 1912 and originally called Linden Hall. The mansion was designated a Class 2 historic resource by Lower Merion township.

Barrack Hebrew Academy relocated to Bryn Mawr, Pennsylvania in 2008 and the Kohelet Foundation, with the financial support of David Magerman, purchased the campus. Kohelet enlarged the campus to 6.3-acres with the acquisition and merger of two adjacent properties, one of which had been the carriage house for Linden Hall. The school also constructed a Beit Midrash. Kohelet Yeshiva moved to the new campus for the 2010–2011 academic year.

In 2015, Kohelet Yeshiva merged with Kohelet Yeshiva Lab School, a project of the Kohelet Foundation, and added kindergarten through eighth grades to its institution. The initial year of kindergarten and first-grade was held on nearby Montgomery Avenue. Magerman made a $30 million gift to the institution which enabled the school to add a new 2,000-square foot wing in 2016 and the elementary classes moved onto the main campus. The middle school began with the 2017–2018 school year.

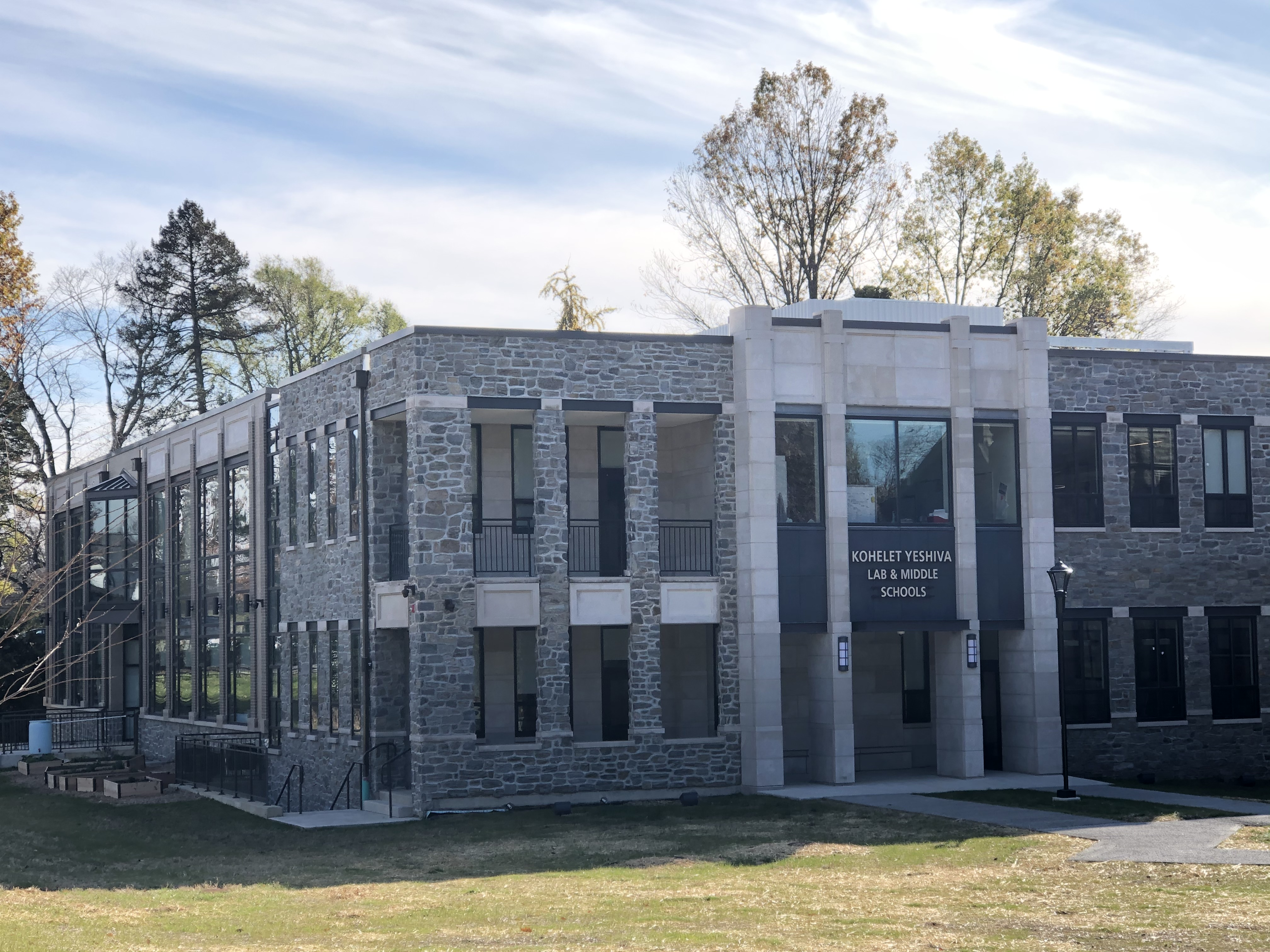
Kohelet Yeshiva Lab & Middle School building (November 2019)

The school opened a 30,000-square-foot building for grades kindergarten through eighth, as well as an outdoor amphitheater, playground, athletic fields, and community garden for the 2019–2020 academic year.

In 2025, Rabbi Maccabee Avishur was hired as Kohelet's Head of School. Rabbi Noam Stein, who served for four years as principal of the high school, moved to Israel with his family. Mrs. Becky Troodler moved to Toronto after ten years working as the principal of the Kohelet Lab and Middle Schools.

In addition to regular college preparatory classes, Kohelet offers the following Advanced Placement (AP) courses: English, United States History, United States Government, World History, Calculus, Statistics, Biology, Chemistry, Physics, Psychology, and Studio Art.

Kohelet Yeshiva High School's sports team is named the Kings, with soccer, basketball, cross-country, tennis, track and baseball programs for boys, and soccer, cross-country, tennis, track and basketball programs for girls.

== Notable alumni ==
- Sam Salz, wide receiver for the Texas A&M Aggies
