= Doris Große =

German art model

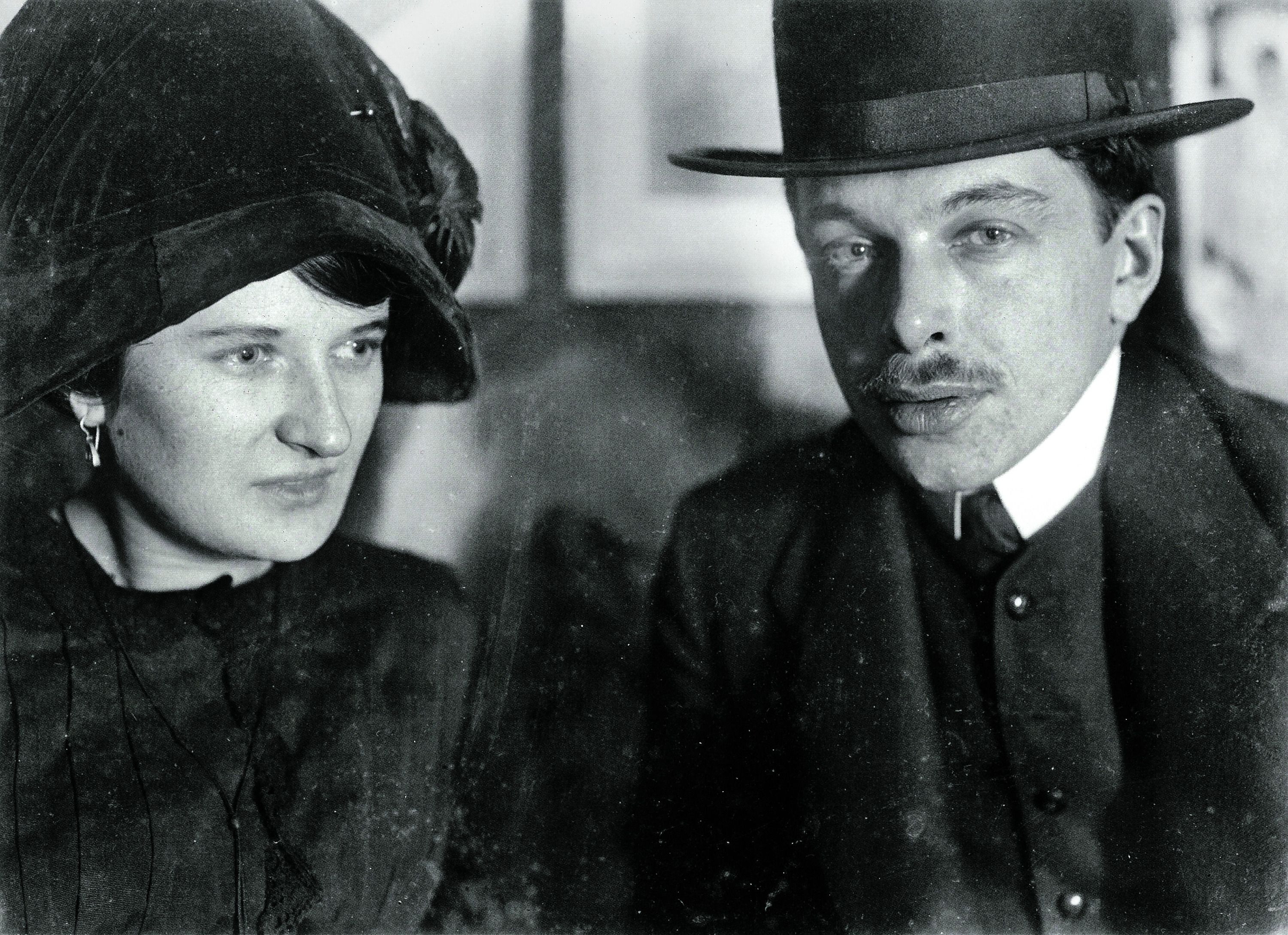
Doris and Kirchner c. 1910 in Dresden

Doris Armgart "Dodo" Große (born 5 June 1884 in Dürrröhrsdorf near Dresden, Germany; date of death unknown) was a German artists' model and the lover of Ernst Ludwig Kirchner (1880–1938), a German expressionist painter and printmaker and one of the founders of the artists' group Die Brücke.

== Life ==
Doris Große was the ninth of eleven children born to caterer Friedrich August Grosse (d. 1894) and his wife Juliane Ernestine, née Krahl (d. 1902). Some years after her father's death, around 1901, Doris moved with her mother to Dresden. After her mother's death the following year, she continued to live in Dresden with her sisters Frieda Paula and Juliette Armgart, working as a shop assistant. In 1903 or 1904, she first met the artist Ernst Ludwig Kirchner, and soon became his lover and favoured model, a relationship that continued until shortly before Kirchner left for Berlin in 1911. During this time, Kirchner bestowed on her the pet name that she was to be best known by, "Dodo".

After Kirchner's departure from Berlin, little is known of Doris and her sisters until 1935–1937, when they were registered as living in Dresden. At the time, Doris was registered in the Dresden directory as a milliner. They both moved in 1936, and Doris is known to have taken early retirement in 1937. There is no record of her death.

== Gallery ==
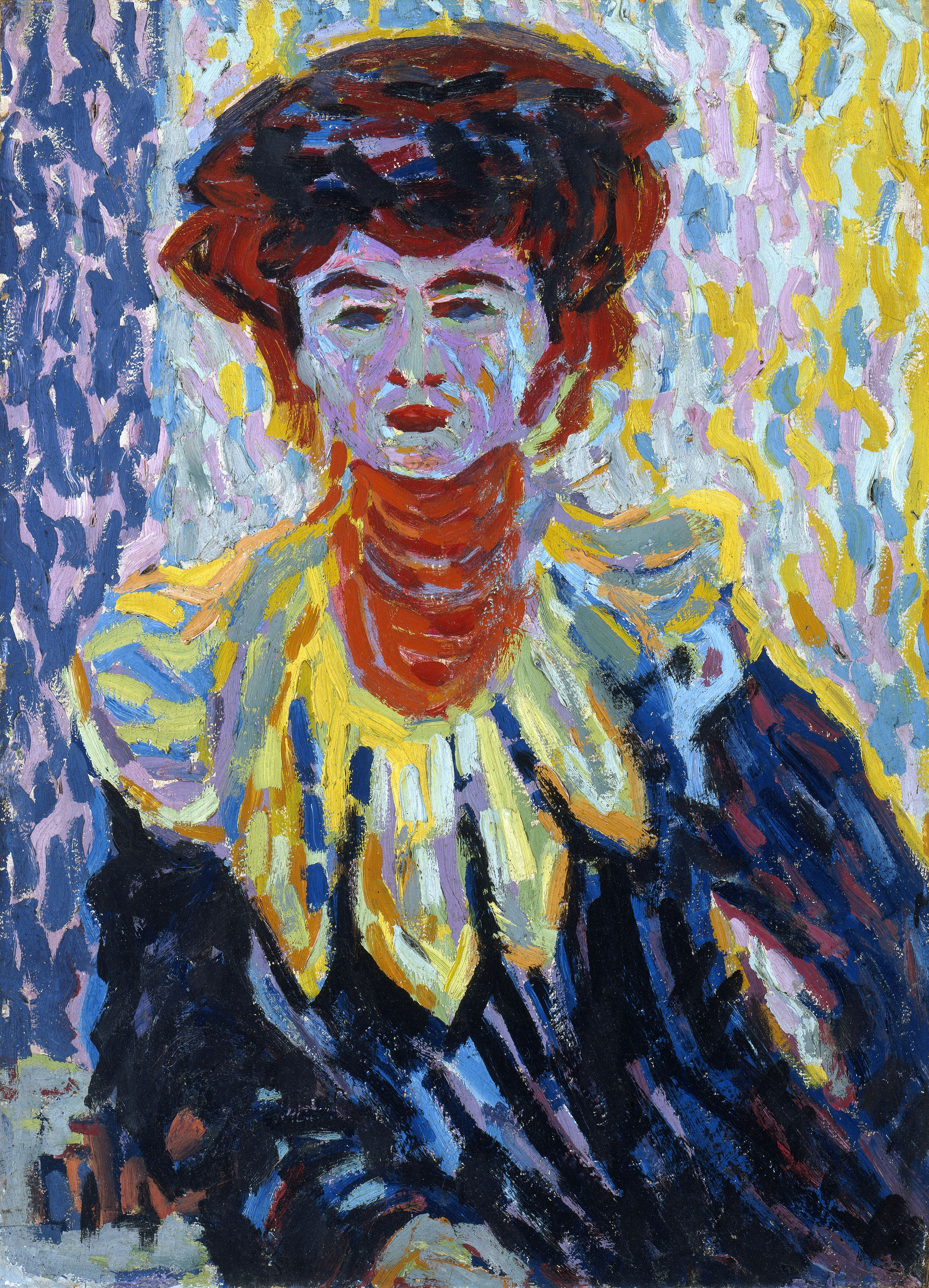
Doris with Ruff Collar, c. 1906, Thyssen-Bornemisza Museum, Madrid

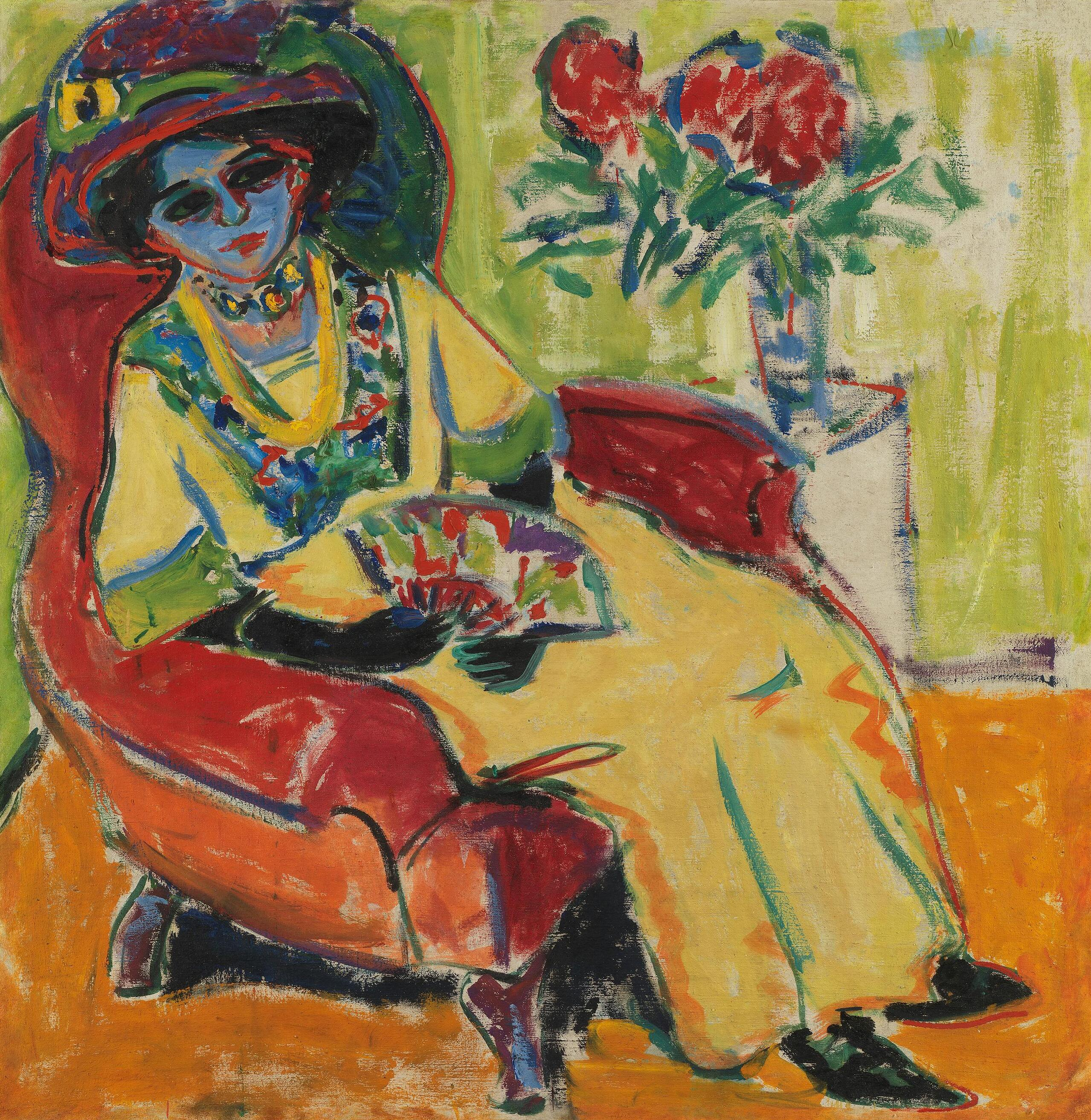
Sitting Woman (Dodo), 1907, Pinakothek der Moderne, Munich

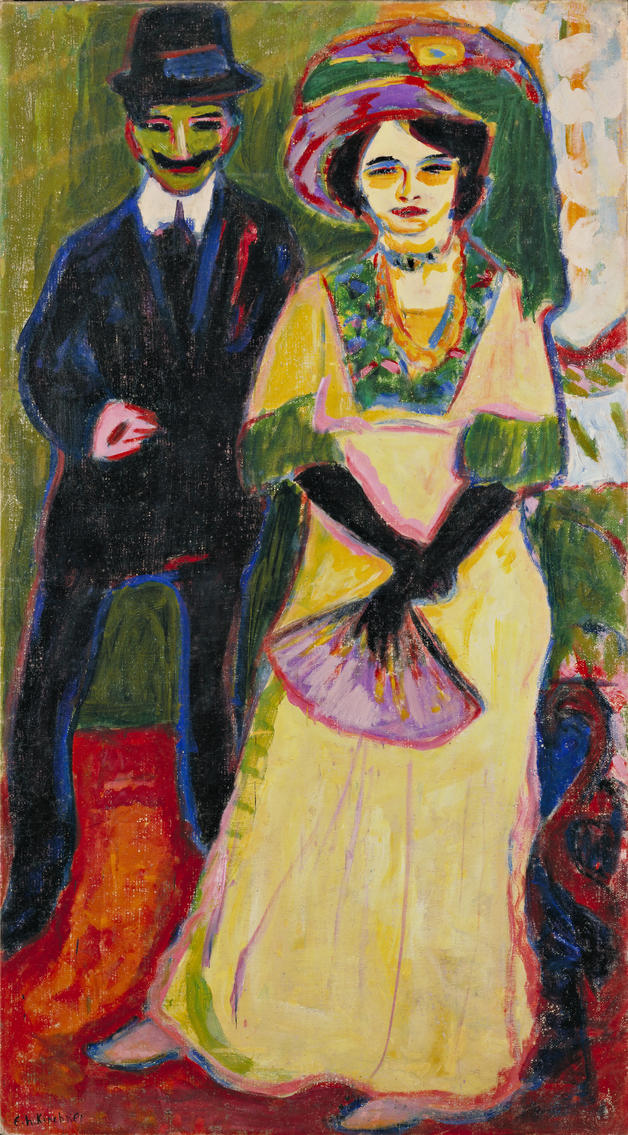
Dodo and her Brother, c. 1908, Smith College Museum of Art

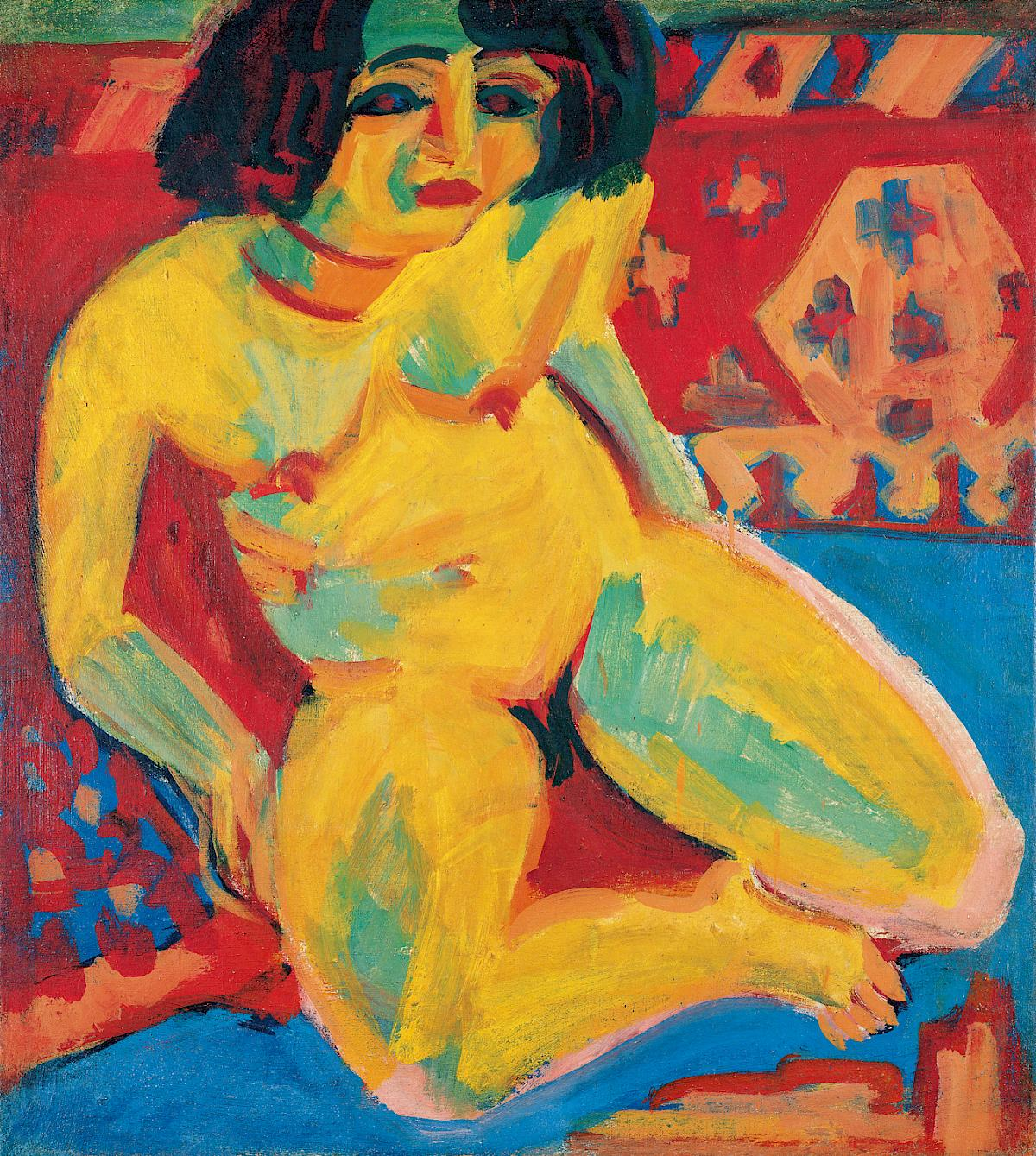
Female Nude (Dodo), 1909 reworked 1919, Albertina, Vienna

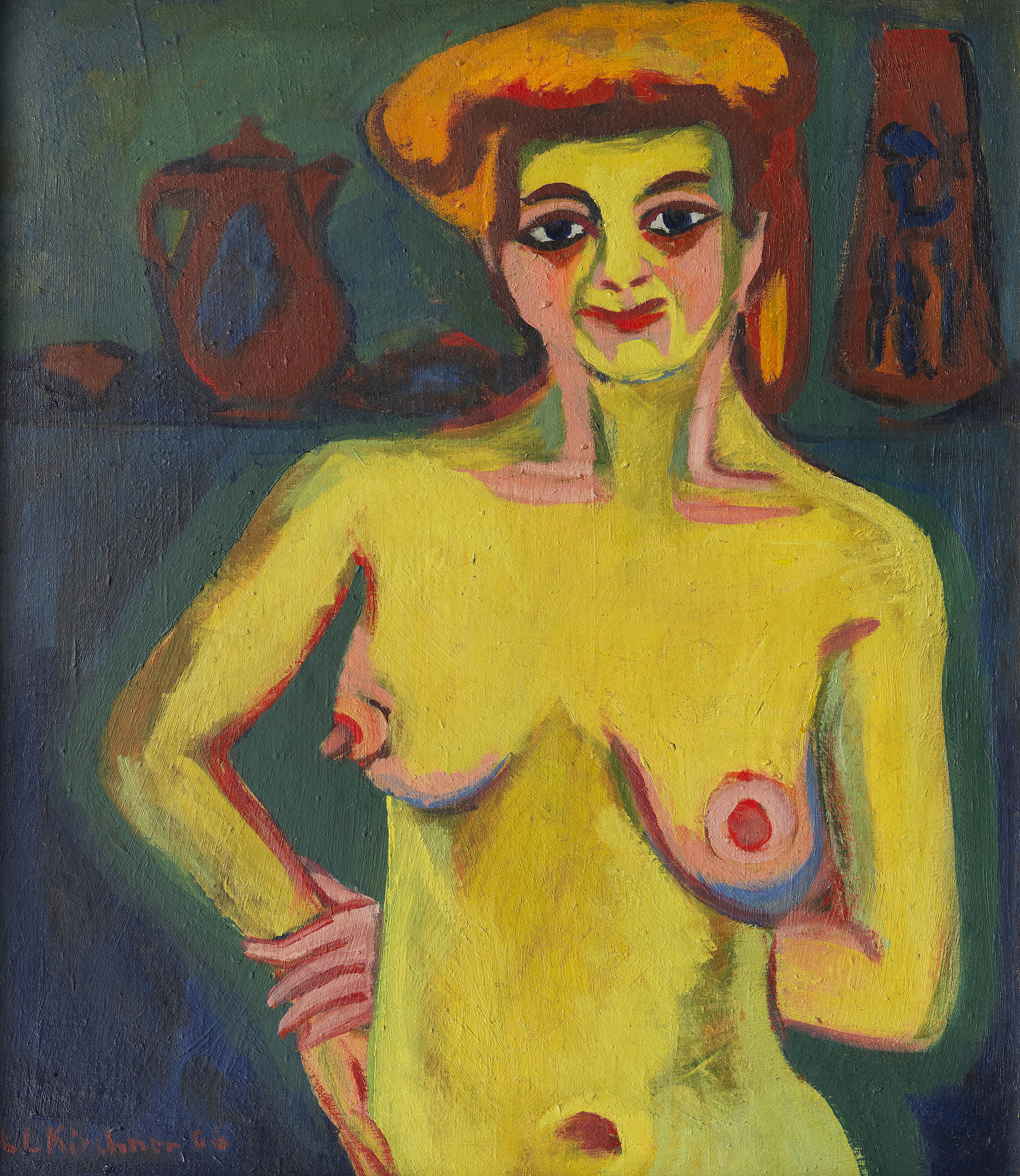
Yellow-Green Half-Length Nude, 1910 reworked 1926, Private collection

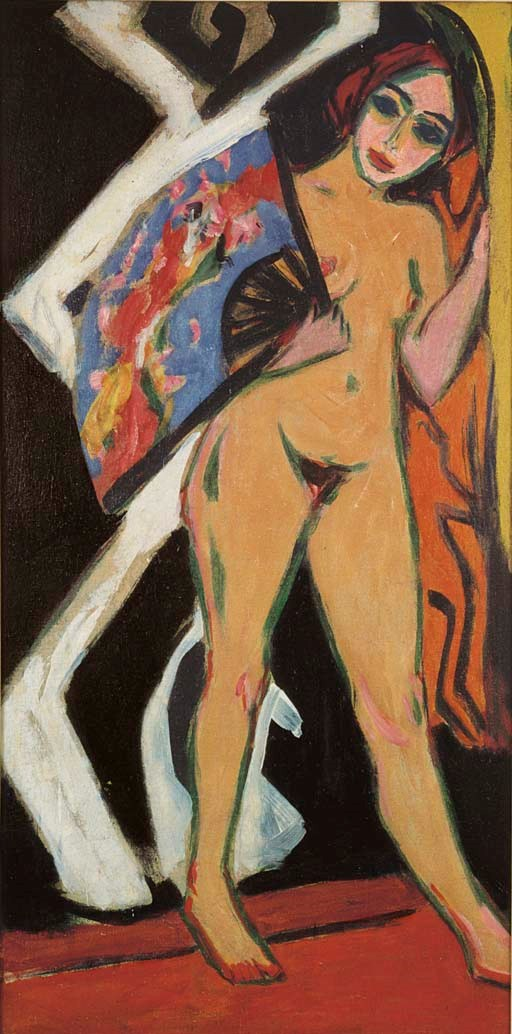
Dodo with a Large Fan, 1910, Private collection

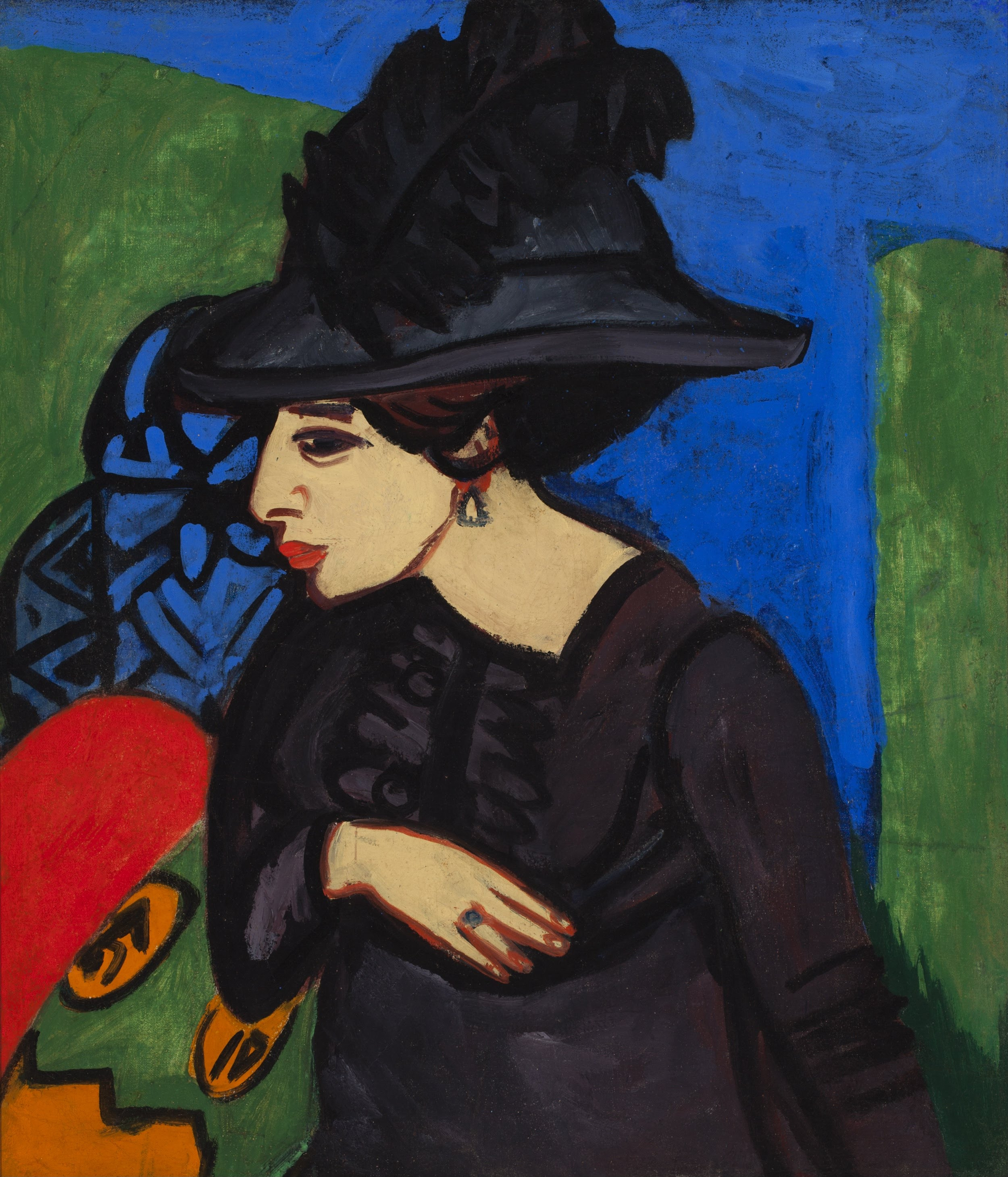
Dodo with a Feather Hat, 1911, Milwaukee Museum of Art

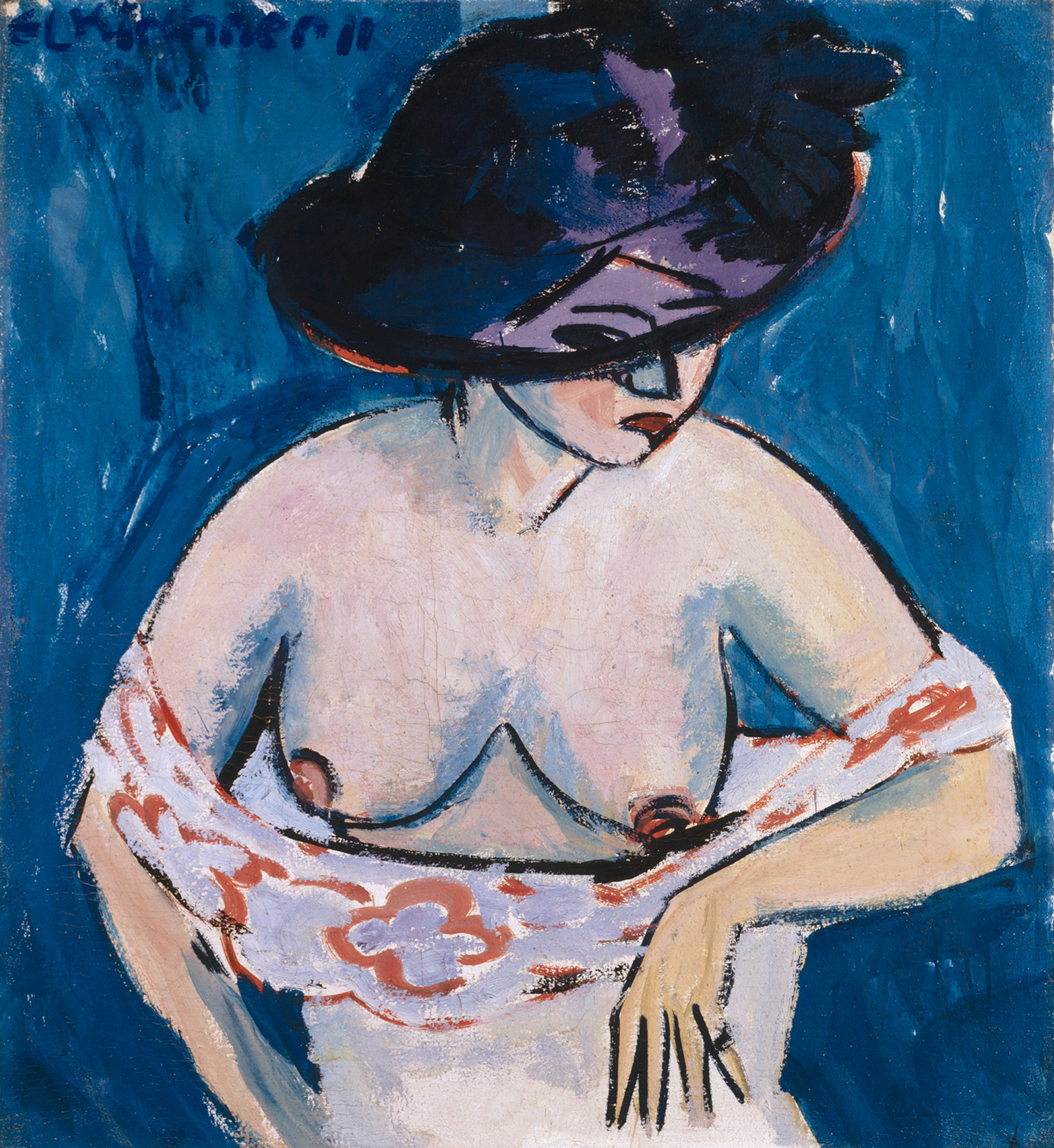
Half-Length Nude with Hat, 1911, Museum Ludwig, Cologne
