= Charles Édouard Armand-Dumaresq =

French painter and illustrator

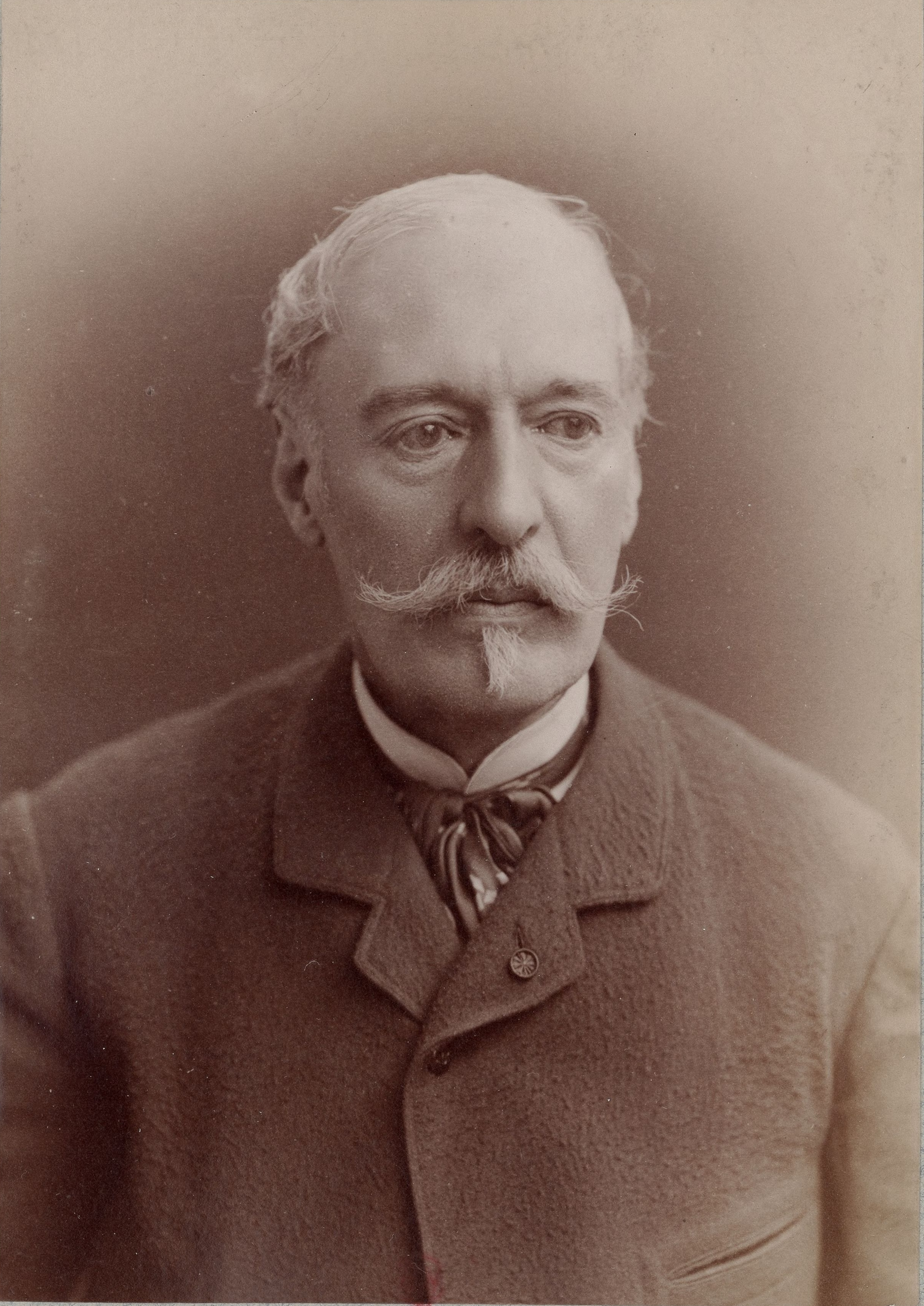
Armand-Dumaresq; photograph by Nadar

Charles Édouard Armand-Dumaresq (1 January 1826 – 6 March 1895 was a French painter and illustrator who specialized in military subjects.

== Early life and education ==
Armand-Dumaresq was born on 1 January 1826, in Paris, France. His father, Gabriel Armand, was also a painter.

== Career ==
He began his art studies with Thomas Couture and was originally a watercolorist and painter. He concentrated on religious themes before becoming interested in military art. In 1858, he was legally authorized to add his mother's maiden name to his, becoming Armand-Dumaresq.

He was a member of the jury at the painting exhibition of the Exposition Universelle (1867). Shortly after, he exhibited his monumental tableau Cambronne at Waterloo, for which Napoléon III awarded him the Cross of the Legion of Honor. Later, the painting was purchased by Isma'il Pasha, the Khedive of Egypt.

In 1870, the Ministry of National Education dispatched him on a mission to the United States to study various methods of teaching drawing for industrial applications. He had recently completed a similar study in the Netherlands.

During his investigations, he interacted with the art community in the eastern part of the country, and making contacts at the United States Naval Academy in West Point, New York. He concluded that the superiority of French methods was recognized there, citing the employment of several French citizens in the engraving and printing department of the u.S. Treasury Department. He painted and sketched very little during his trip, but created numerous American-themed works upon his return.

Towards the end of his career, he worked with the Belgian painter, Louis Van Engelen (1856-1940), to create a panorama of the Battle of Bapaume from the Franco-Prussian War; now preserved in the Town hall of Bapaume.

His works may be seen at the Château de Versailles, the print collection of the Bibliothèque nationale de France and in the "Musée national de la coopération franco-américaine" at the Château de Blérancourt.

One of his works, The Signing of the Declaration of Independence, is on display in the Cabinet Room at the White House. It was donated by Sam Salz during the Kennedy Administration. A copy is kept at the Clinton Presidential Center.

== Death ==
He died on 6 March 1895, in Paris.

== Selected paintings ==
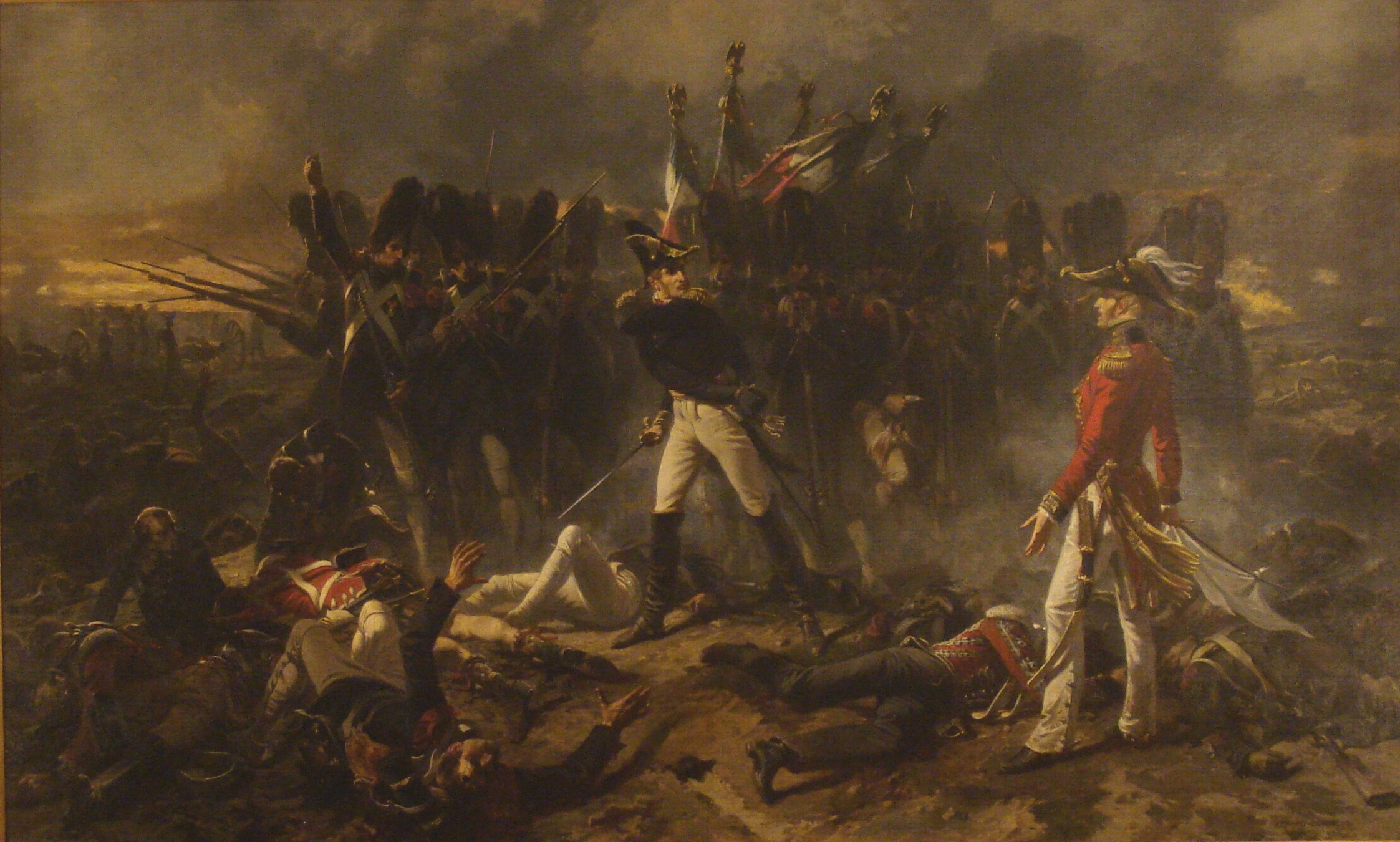
Cambronne at Waterloo

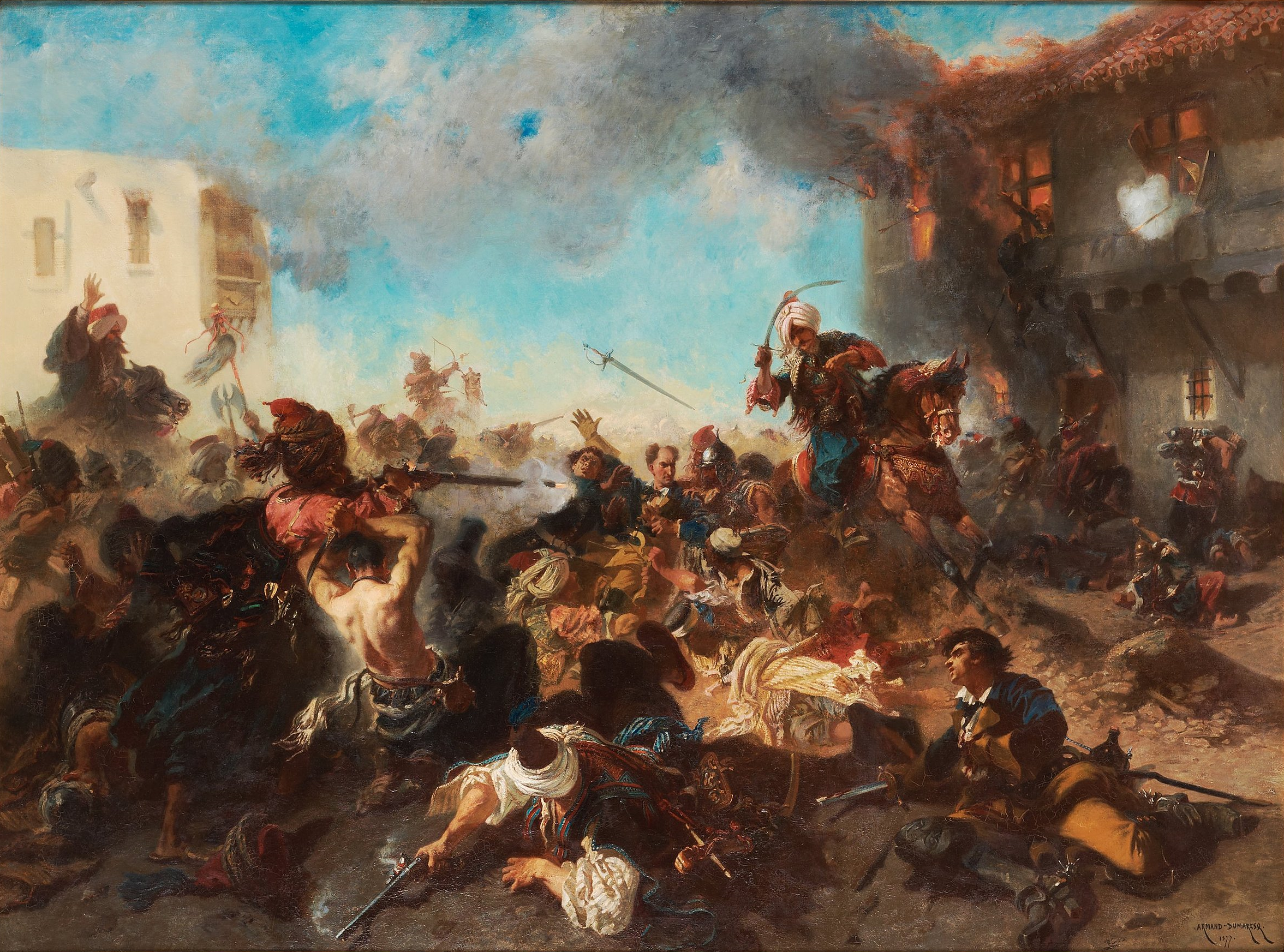
The Skirmish at Bender

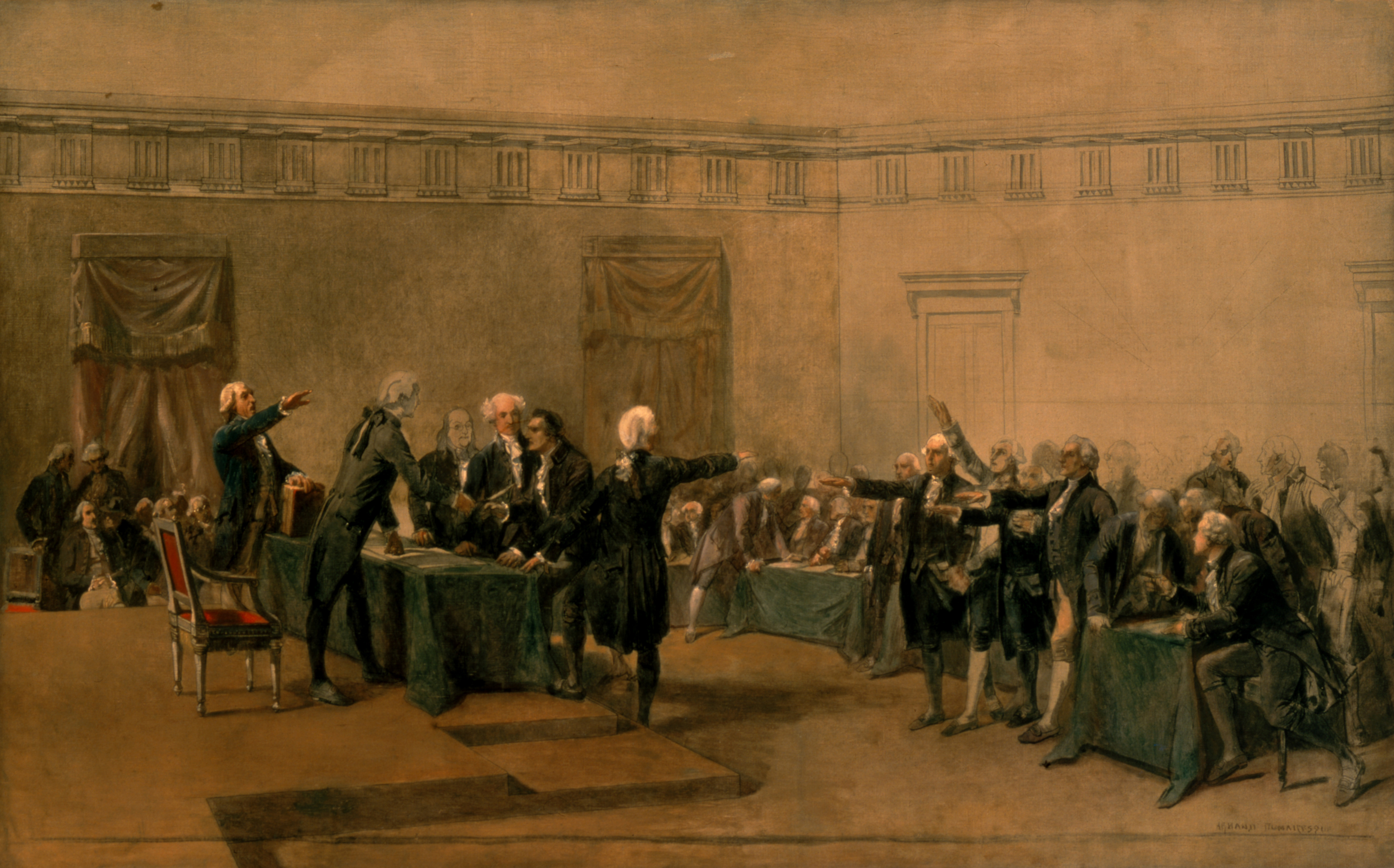
The Signing of the Declaration of Independence

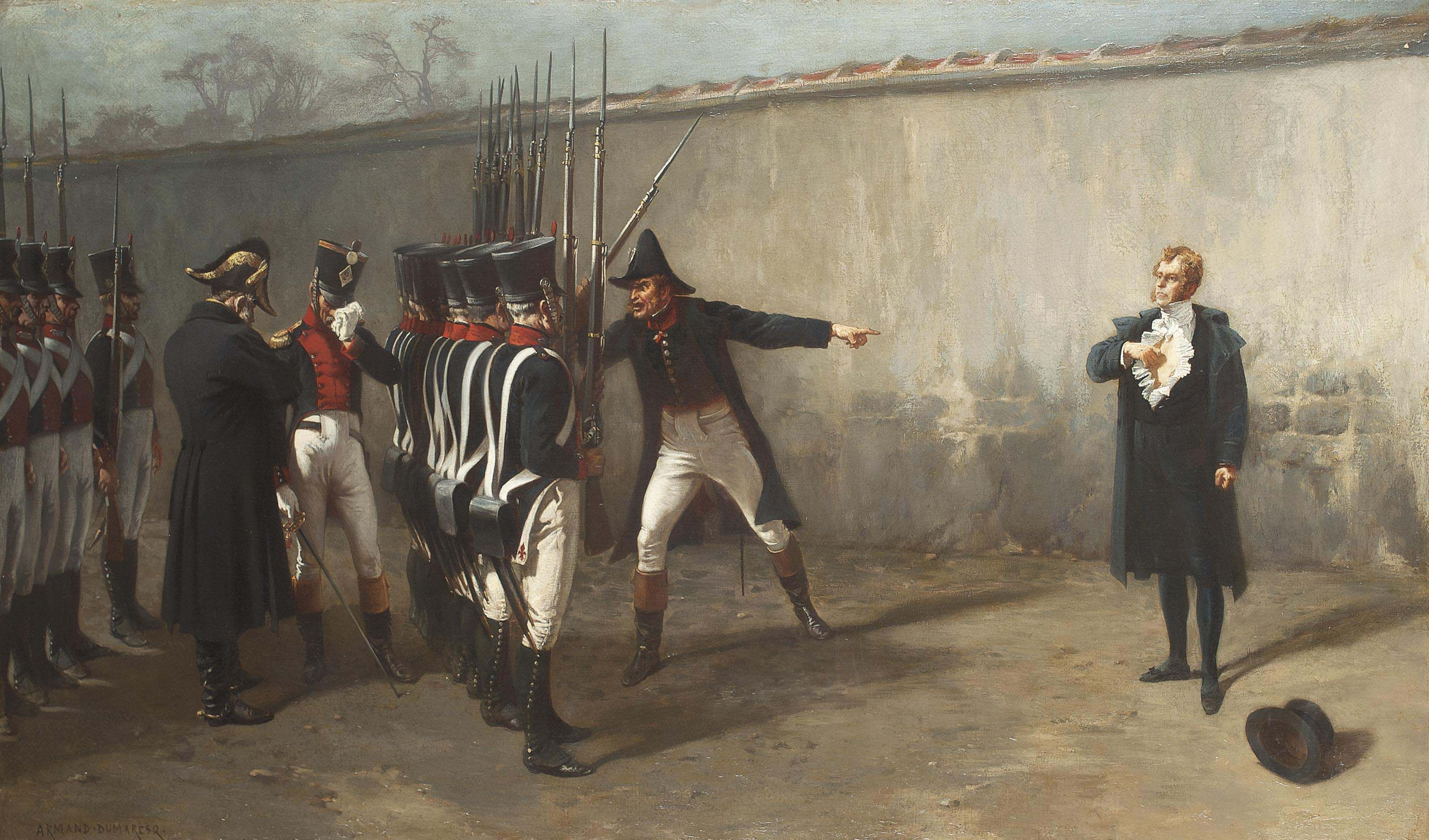
The Execution of Marshal Ney
