= Lina Franziska Fehrmann =

German artists model

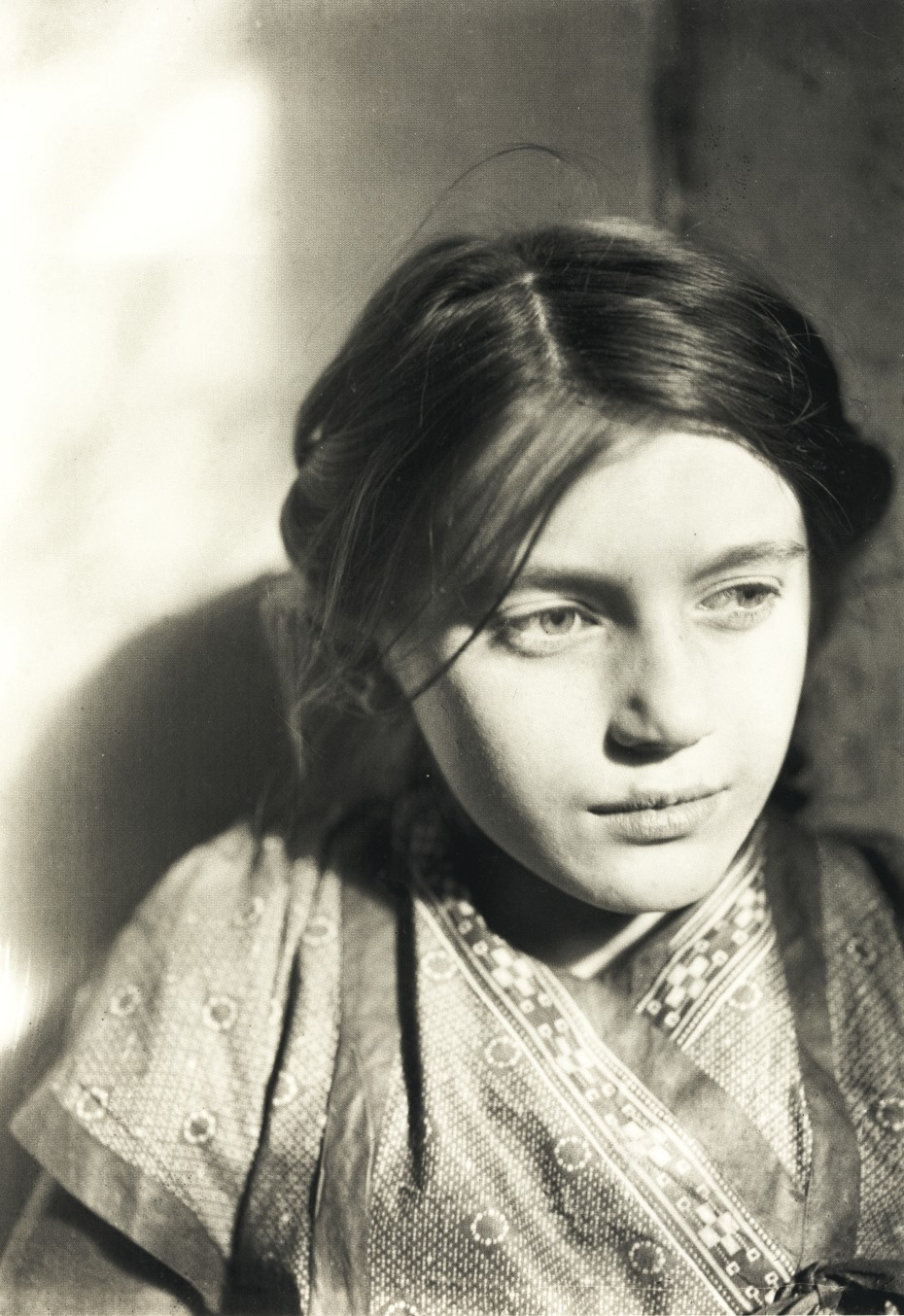
Portrait of Lina Franziska Fehrmann by Ernst Ludwig Kirchner

Lina Franziska Fehrmann (born in Dresden on 11 October 1900; died 10 June 1950) was a German artist model generally called Fränzi and associated with Die Brücke.

== Life and Career ==
Fränzi was the youngest of 15 children. Her father Oskar Emil, who died in 1921, was a locksmith's hand and later, in 1910, a machinist. Her mother, Alma Lina Clementine née Pazi (1860-1944), supported the family through her millinery shop in Dresden.

Fränzi had two illegitimate children by 1926. Kirchner noted that she was "very sad and gloomy because of her misfortune with the children." She married Alfred Fleischer, a printer, in 1931. They divorced in 1948.

Alongside a girl named Marzella (possibly her sister, 1895-?), Fränzi became a popular child model of the Expressionist movement, especially in 1909-10. Her role in the Brücke's works has occasionally been deemed unsettling. Fränzi was discovered by the Dresden Akademie caretaker, who arranged her first modelling assignments. The artists began painting her nude from the age of eight due to their fascination with her "unconsciously erotic" prepubescent body.

Fränzi often appears unposed and stilted in pictures, as well as vulnerable, primitively or shockingly erotic, and childlike. Initial sketches and photographs of her appeared in the summer of 1909 (in an area by the Moritzburg lakes north of Dresden), primarily by Kirchner, though Pechstein and Heckel were also present. In 1910, further works were created of Marzella and Fränzi in Dresden, although it is hard to tell them apart due to the hasty nature of the sketches.

Fränzi is referred to often as "the Child" in works to emphasize her role in the Brücke's exploration of puberty and human growth. Drawings often show her in motion: through Fränzi, Kirchner was able to explore motion. She appears in works such as Heckel's Child (1909) and Child with Shell Necklace (1909), as well as Kirchner's Seated Girl (1910) and Heckel's Franzi Reclining (1910).
