= Sam Salz (art dealer) =

Art dealer (1894–1981)

- Born: March 12, 1894; Radomyśl Wielki, Galicia, Austria-Hungary
- Died: March 21, 1981; New York City
- Occupation: Art dealer

Sam Salz (1894-1981) was an art dealer, art collector, and patron of the arts. He was born March 12, 1894, in Radomyśl Wielki, (then in Galicia, Austria-Hungary; since 1921 in Poland). He died on March 21, 1981, in New York City.

== Personal life and start as an art dealer ==
The son of a Torah sofer, Salz was born in 1894 in the Galicia province of Austria-Hungary. Not wanting to follow his father into a career as a sofer, Salz enrolled in the Akademia Sztuk Pięknych (Academy of Beautiful Arts) in Krakow. At age 17, he traveled to Vienna to study painting and art history at the Academy of Fine Arts. During World War I he served in the Austrian army. After the war, Salz traveled to Paris to resume his study of art. After a short time working as an artist, he gave up his artistic plans and began to work in the art market. He became friends with one art dealer, Gaston Bernheim-Jeune, and worked for another, Ambroise Vollard, beginning around 1920.

In 1939, he married Marina Franca, a dancer with the Ballet Russe de Monte-Carlo. Salz's marriage to the Dutch dancer ended in divorce. Marina and Sam had two sons, Marc and Andre. In 1970, Salz married Janet Reisner Traeger. He died in 1981 at the age of 87 in New York City. By the marriage of his son Marc, Salz was the step–great grandfather of the eventual American football player who has the same name.

Salz was related to psychologist Irvin Sam Schonfeld.

== Professional life ==
In the 1920s he opened a gallery in Cologne, where Salz sold works by Marc Chagall, Hans Arp, Georges Braque, and James Ensor. From 1926 to 1930 he worked in Brussels and then worked in Paris and London by the end of the 1930s. He purchased works of art directly from artists such as André Derain, Maurice de Vlaminck, Édouard Vuillard, Pierre Bonnard, and Chaïm Soutine. He got to know Pablo Picasso and Henri Matisse personally. This period also saw several portraits of Salz, including a watercolor by James Ensor, a pastel by Édouard Vuillard, and a photographic portrait by the German photographer August Sander.

Salz visited the United States for the first time in 1936. He settled in New York City in 1938. After the Second World War, he was involved in the repatriation of stolen art works. In New York, he began to specialize in the art of Impressionism. From his New York base, he sold artworks by Pierre-Auguste Renoir, Paul Cézanne, Edgar Degas, Camille Pissarro, Claude Monet, Édouard Manet, Alfred Sisley, André Dunoyer de Segonzac, and Henri de Toulouse-Lautrec. At first he used an outside gallery, but eventually he created a private gallery in his home on East 76 Street, to which he asked potential buyers to come in order to show them his private art collection.

His clients have included renowned museums and collectors like Albert C. Barnes, Paul Mellon, Robert Lehman, Henry Ford II, David Rockefeller, and William S. Paley. Salz also sold artwork to personalities from the film world such as Greta Garbo, Orson Welles, Billy Wilder, Kirk Douglas, and Edward G. Robinson. Among Salz's friends were writer Erich Maria Remarque, pianist Vladimir Horowitz, and painter Diego Rivera.

== Charitable donations ==
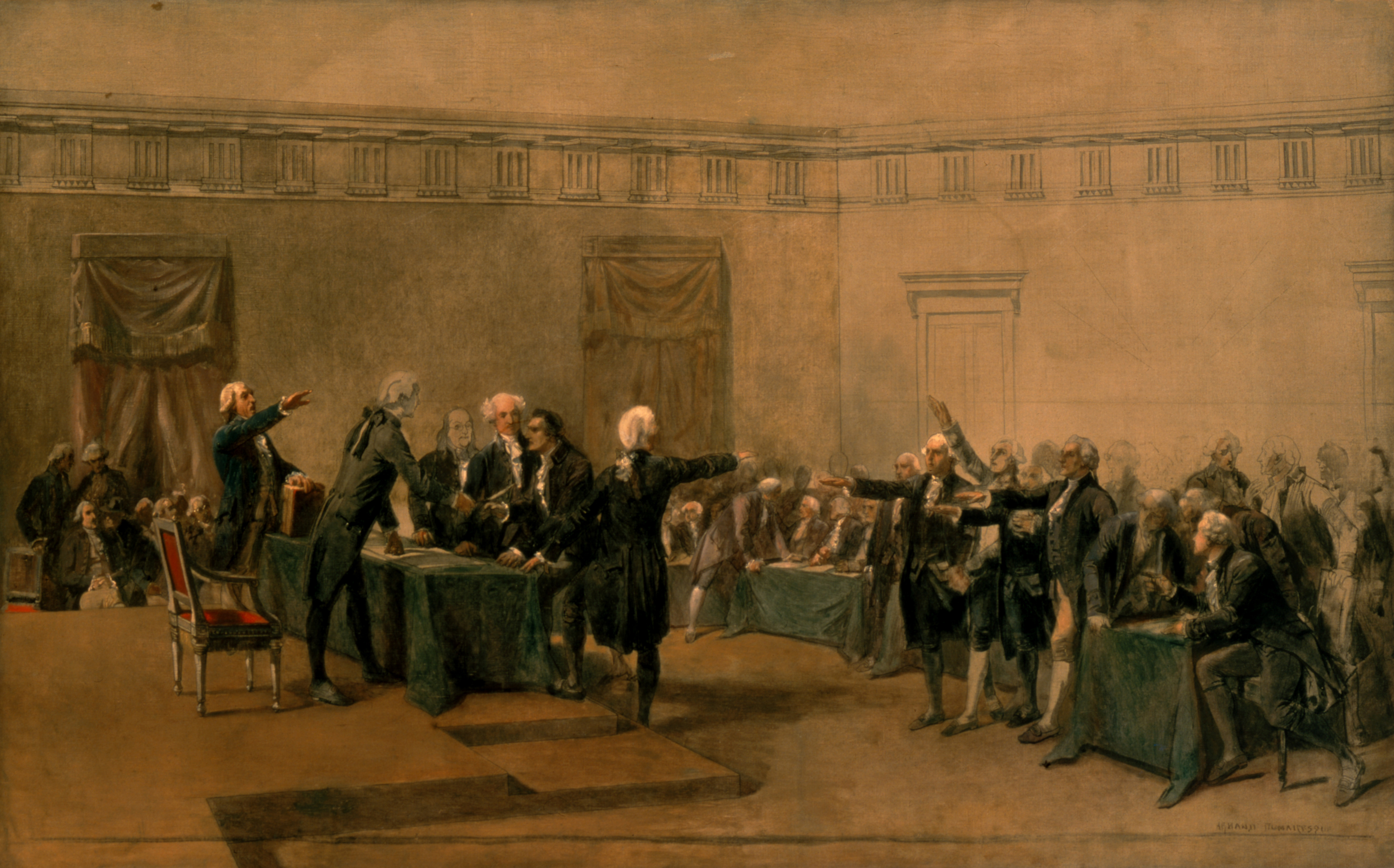
The Declaration of Independence of the United States of America, July 4, 1776, circa 1873 by Charles Édouard Armand-Dumaresq, has been on display in the White House Cabinet Room since the late-1980s.

Salz gave sketches by Paul Gauguin to the Israel Museum in Jerusalem. In 1959, he donated Édouard Manet's Asparagus to the Louvre (placed in the Musée d'Orsay in 1986). To the Art Institute of Chicago, he gave works including, in 1963, Virgin and Child with Saint Elizabeth and John the Baptist as a Child by Jacques Blanchard. He presented Claude Monet's The Bodmer Oak, Fontainebleau Forest to the Metropolitan Museum of Art. He donated the sculpture The Serf by Henri Matisse and paintings and drawings by Vuillard to the Museum of Modern Art. In recognition of his philanthropy, the Metropolitan Museum of Art named Salz as Fellow in Perpetuity of the Museum. In Jerusalem, Salz underwrote the construction of a small park Gan Moshe Tsaltz (גן משה זלץ; Moshe Salz Garden), which is named for his father, who had been murdered by the Germans during the Holocaust.

During the Kennedy administration, he donated to the White House the painting The Declaration of Independence of the United States of America, July 4, 1776 by Charles Édouard Armand-Dumaresq.

== Collections ==
Part of Salz's photographic archive related to his career as a dealer is available in the Department of Image Collections at the National Gallery of Art Library.
