= Sam Salz (American football) =

American football player (born 2002)

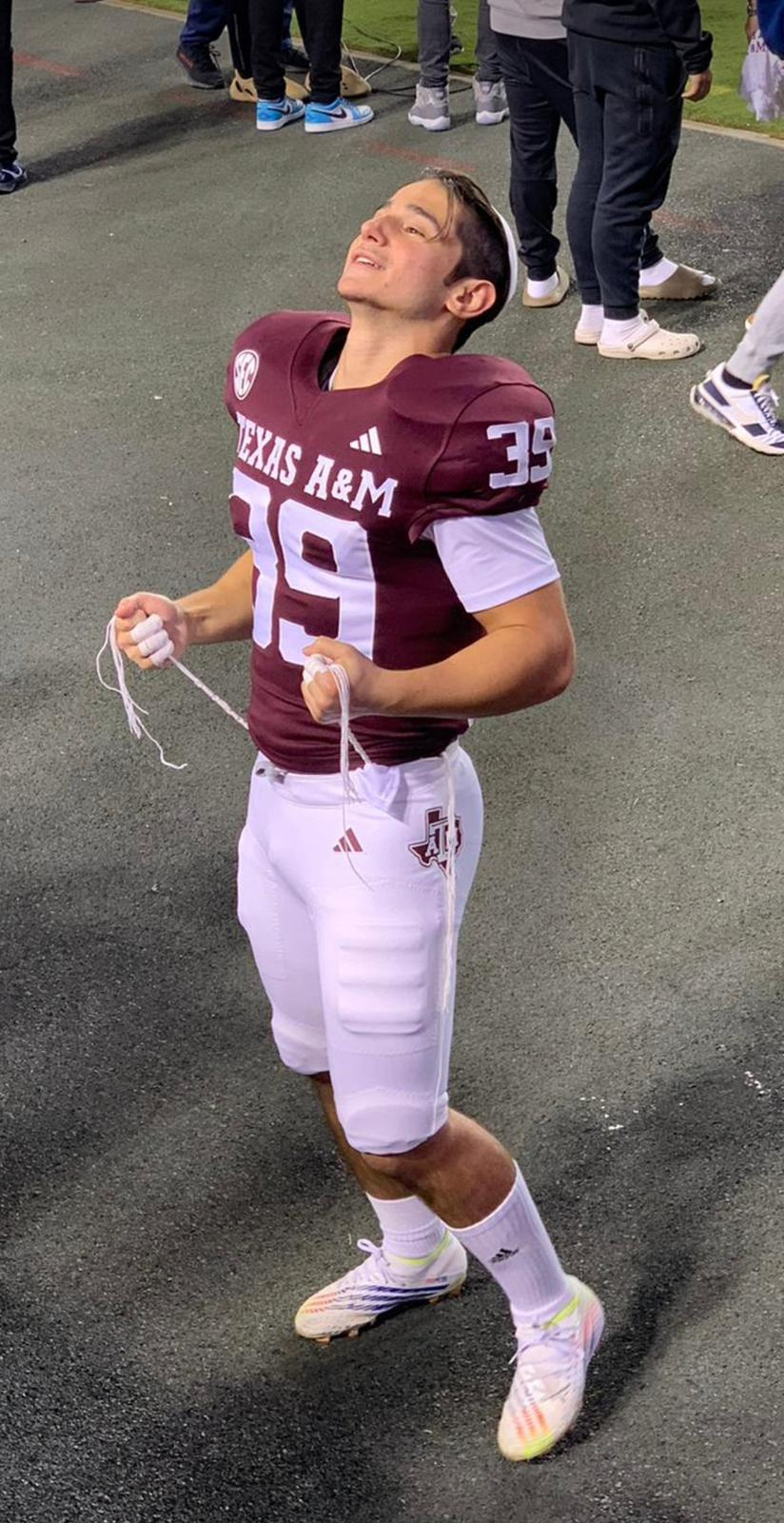
- Salz in 2023

No. 39
- Position: Wide receiver

Personal information
- Born: c. 2002; Philadelphia, Pennsylvania U.S.
- Listed height: 5 ft 6 in (1.68 m)
- Listed weight: 160 lb (73 kg)

Career information
- High school: Kohelet Yeshiva High School
- College: Texas A&M (2022–2024)
- Stats at ESPN

Sam Salz is an American former college football wide receiver who played for the Texas A&M Aggies. He is thought to be the first and only orthodox Jewish football player in NCAA Division I. Salz did not play organized football at any level prior to being added to the Texas A&M program as a walk-on. As he was not invited to join the football team, he practiced by himself within sight of the team and eventually earned a roster spot. He was on the Texas A&M roster for three seasons and played in one game for them.

== Early life ==
Salz was born c. 2002 and is from Philadelphia, Pennsylvania. He graduated from a Modern Orthodox college prep school: Kohelet Yeshiva High School. He is 5.6 ft (1.7 m) and weighs 160 lb (73 kg). He did not play football in high school because his school did not have a football program. He also never played organized football in middle school: he never played organized football at any level. As an observant orthodox Jew, Salz never watched college football because it is played on the Shabbat. In 2022 he went to Texas A&M University to study economics. Salz was related to the research psychologist Irvin S. Schonfeld.

== College football ==
In 2022, Sam Salz was a sophomore at Texas A&M University and he wanted to be on the football team, but he had no football experience. The football team has a rule that only players with high school football experience could try out. Salz did not meet the requirement so he was not part of the football team; instead he began training within sight of the A&M practice field. When the Texas A&M Aggies football team was practicing, Salz practiced by himself. He kept notes of the drills the football team did and tried to mimic their routines. He used items he could find to fashion makeshift cones and create a line of scrimmage for practice. He kept up his practice routine in sight of the team for 11 months, and the coaches began to notice him. Salz described his daily practice routine: "About an hour and half to an hour doing field work.. catching.. doing footwork... working on taking hand-offs, and then I would spend about two and a half to three hours in the gym getting bigger. He began attending the head coach’s Jimbo Fisher's radio show to show his determination and persistence.

Salz is a walk-on football player and he practices with the Texas A&M Aggies football team. He practices at the offensive position of wide receiver. In 2023 The Atlanta Jewish Times stated that Salz was thought to be the only orthodox Jewish football player in NCAA Division I. He wears a Chabad "A&M” kippah under his football helmet and he wears the jersey number 39. His jersey number is meant to symbolize (lamed tet melachot) the 39 tasks or items which Jews should avoid during the Jewish Sabbath. He also wears his tzitzit under his jersey. The Sabbath begins at sundown on Friday and lasts until sundown on Saturday so if Salz were to compete with the team in games, he could only play in Saturday night games.

In 2023, Salz was a junior and had not appeared in any football games for the Aggies. Salz has said he hopes to be drafted into the NFL and become a motivational speaker. Mark Robinson (Texas A&M’s associate athletic director) said that Salz practices alongside several Muslim football players that observe the fasting of Ramadan. The football team schedules practices to accommodate the Muslim players.

Towards the end of the 2024 Texas A&M season, Salz's senior year, the Aggies played a night game against New Mexico State, allowing him a chance to play. With 42 seconds left in the game, he was sent in to play on special teams and appeared on the kickoff, marking the first time he had played in a football game at any level.
