= Berlin Street Scene =

Painting by Ernst Ludwig Kirchner

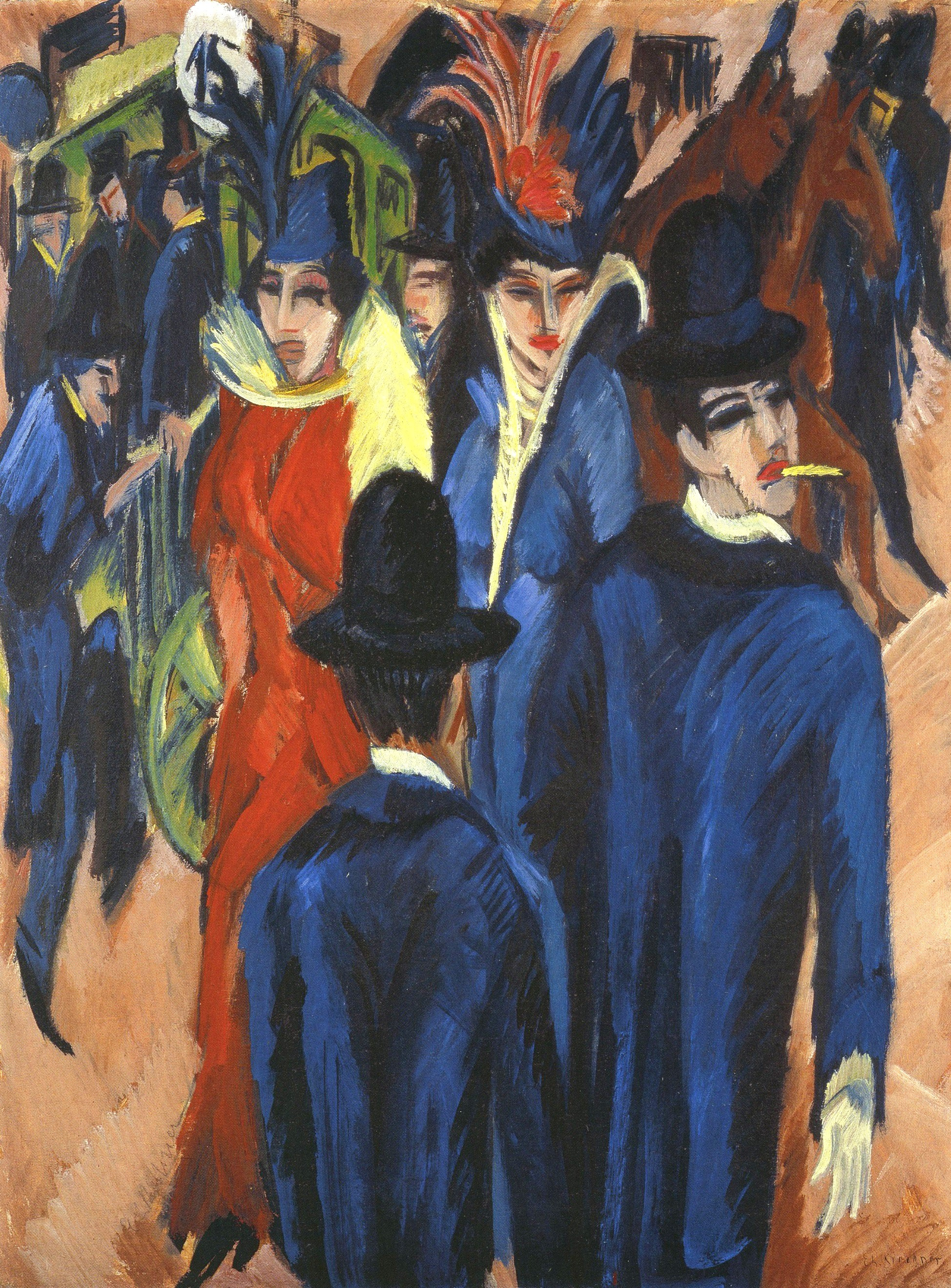
- Artist: Ernst Ludwig Kirchner
- Year: 1913
- Medium: oil on canvas
- Movement: Expressionism
- Dimensions: 121 cm × 95 cm (48 in × 37 in)
- Location: Neue Galerie New York, New York

Berlin Street Scene (German: Berliner Straßenszene) is a 1913 painting from the cycle Street scenes, by the German expressionist artist Ernst Ludwig Kirchner. The cycle, created by Kirchner between 1913 and 1915, often depicts "Kokotten" (prostitutes) with their clients, and is regarded as one of the most important works of German Expressionism.

== Description ==
In the painting foreground, two prostitutes are seen wearing very colourful clothing with elaborate lace collars and high-fashion hats. Two clients are depicted— one is facing the viewer, one is facing the prostitutes. The model for the clients probably was the artist's friend, Otto Mueller, but it is possible that Kirchner depicted himself as the model. The models for the two prostitutes are the sisters Erna and Gerad Schilling.

In the background is a busy street. On the street are a horse carriage and the sign of the tram line 15, a horsecar that ran through central Berlin. The women look at the two men provocatively. One of the men is giving them his attention, the other is looking away. The cropped representation of the two men creates the impression of a momentary capture.

== Style ==
In the painting influences of Italian Futurism can be found through the hasty dynamic of the work. The angular language of form is borrowed from Cubism.

== Interpretation ==
Kirchner often depicted prostitutes and their relationship to their clients. This was not meant as social criticism but rather an attempt to depict his idea of a new independent type of woman. Kirchner noted:

The street scenes developed in the years from 1911 to 1914. It was one of the loneliest times in my life, in which I wandered through the long streets full of people and wagons through day and night in agonizing unrest.

== Restitution ==
In 2006 Anita Halpin, the granddaughter of the Jewish art collector Alfred Hess, demanded the restitution of the painting, which had previously been exhibited in the Brücke Museum in Berlin. The city granted the restitution.

After that the painting was sold by the auction house Christie's for 30 million Euros (approximately USD$38 million) to the art collectors Ronald Lauder and Serge Sabarsky. Then it became part of inventory of the Neue Galerie in New York.

The restitution was based on the Washington Declaration from 1998 in which Germany said it would return the paintings that were confiscated during the Nazi era to the heirs of the victims. The public reaction to the restitution was very negative. It was questioned whether the widow of Alfred Hess had been forced to sell the painting. Her family had gotten into financial troubles in 1929 after the world economic crisis and she could therefore have sold the painting for financial reasons. However the circumstances of the selling of the painting are unclear. The painting was transferred to the Cologne art association in 1936 and there sold to the art collector Carl Hagemann under unclear circumstances. Many people still questions whether the Washington Declaration was applicable in this case. It was doubted that the sale was connected to the persecution of Jews. Furthermore the Washington Declaration wasn't legally binding, therefore it wasn't necessary to restore the painting for legal reasons. Several complaints were filed against politicians from Berlin that had been involved in the restitution. The attorney's office however refused to file charges, which is why there were no convictions. Supporters of the Brücke Museum still demand that the painting be returned to them.
