= Five Bathing Women at a Lake =

Painting by Ernst Ludwig Kirchner

- Five Bathing Women at a Lake (English)
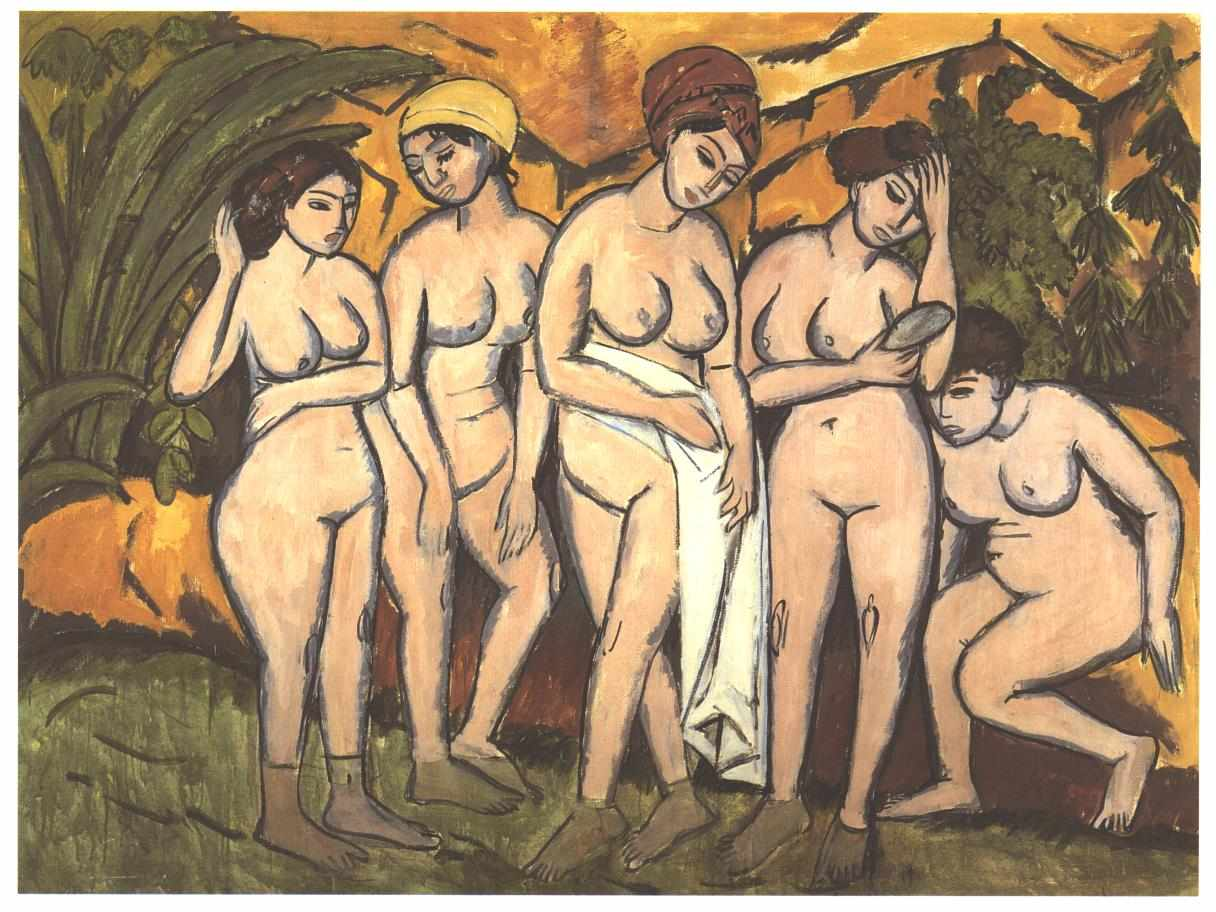
- Artist: Ernst Ludwig Kirchner
- Medium: Oil on canvas
- Dimensions: 150,5 cm × 200 cm (593 in × 79 in)
- Location: Brücke Museum; Berlin

Five Bathing at a Lake (German: Fünf badende am See) is an oil-on-canvas painting by the Expressionist German painter Ernst Ludwig Kirchner, from 1911. It depicts five nude women, in different poses, near a lake, four of them with their feet already in the water. The painting is in the Brücke Museum, in Berlin.
