= C10H14O3 =

The molecular formula C_{10}H_{14}O_{3} (molar mass: 182.22 g/mol, exact mass: 182.0943 u) may refer to:

- Hagemann's ester, or ethyl-2-methyl-4-oxo-2-cyclohexenecarboxylate
- Mephenesin
