= Erwin Petermann =

Erwin Petermann (born 12 September 1904 in Stuttgart, died 6 April 1989 in Stuttgart, Germany) was a German art historian and museum director, persecuted by the Nazis.

== Life ==
=== Education ===
In 1925, Petermann passed the first state examination for teachers and a matriculation examination. In 1926, he started studying classical philology, art history, and classical archaeology at the universities of Munich, Tübingen, and Berlin. Due to financial reasons, he stopped in 1929 and got a job as a teacher trainee at primary and secondary schools in Baden-Württemberg.

In 1926, Petermann joined the Communist Student Faction and the KPD. From 1930 to 1932, he taught in a Marxist workers' school in the evenings.

=== Persecution during the Nazi era ===
In May 1933, Petermann was arrested and dismissed from his teaching position. From June to September 1934, both he and his wife, Helene, were imprisoned. On 10 December 1936, the Higher Regional Court of Stuttgart sentenced Petermann to two years in prison for "preparing to commit high treason"—a sentence he served in Ulm until his early release at the end of May 1937.

A further arrest at the end of September 1939 led to his internment as a "protective custody" prisoner in the Buchenwald concentration camp.

After his release, he began working in 1940 for the firm Rudolf Külbel Lederwaren, which had been based in Kornwestheim since 1934.

=== Graphic Arts Collection at the Staatsgalerie ===
In 1925 Petermann started collecting political drawings by George Grosz, which were confiscated during one of his arrests.

Petermann started visiting the Graphic Collection at the Staatsgalerie Stuttgart in 1938, and the collection's curator, Theodor Musper eventually entrusted him with the task of compiling a catalogue of the etchings by the Württemberg-based painter and graphic artist Heinrich Seufferheld (1866–1940).

=== Head of the Graphic Collection at the Staatsgalerie Stuttgart ===
In June 1945, Musper became director of the Staatsgalerie Stuttgart, while Petermann was appointed head of the graphic art collections and curator at the Staatsgalerie Stuttgart. In 1946, Petermann was promoted to the position of chief conservator.

Petermann played a key role in the Staatsgalerie's post-war exhibitions, which frequently featured works by artists who had been ostracized under the Nazi regime. The first exhibition, held in November 1945, was titled "Art Against War." It showcased works on paper by Käthe Kollwitz, Ernst Barlach, Max Beckmann, Otto Dix, and George Grosz. Petermann built relations with important collections such as Max Kade, Heinrich Scheufelen, Hugo Borst, Thekla and Alfred Hess.

Petermann was in contact with, among others, the artist Christian Anton Laely, who had managed the estate of Ernst Ludwig Kirchner since 1945. When Laely offered 924 works on paper by Ernst Ludwig Kirchner on the art market, Petermann succeeded in 1948 in presenting 122 of these pieces as a loan at the Staatsgalerie. In 1957, the Staatsgalerie was able to purchase 143 works from the collection.

The Staatsgalerie also acquired prints by Old Masters were also added to the collection. Max Kade visited Stuttgart on several occasions, consulting with Petermann on the development of his collection of Old German, Old Netherlandish, and Old Italian prints. In 1953, the Max Kade Foundation donated 223 Old Master prints to the museum, followed in 1955 by a series of 120 early impressions of woodcuts—created by Hans Burgkmair the Elder, Leonhard Beck, and Hans Schäufelin—for the "Weisskunig," an unfinished 16th-century biographical novel about Emperor Maximilian I.

Petermann expanded the Graphic Arts Collection, primarily with works of Classical Modernism. He also advised Musper on acquisitions for the painting collection and played a key role in the purchase of the collection belonging to the Norwegian shipowner Ragnar Moltzau which consisted of 29 works by Paul Gauguin, Henri Matisse, Auguste Renoir, Paul Cézanne, Amedeo Modigliani, and Pablo Picasso, and was purchased in 1959 for ten million Deutsche Marks using funds from the state lottery (Toto-Lotto).

=== Director of the Staatsgalerie Stuttgart ===
Following Musper's retirement at the end of March 1962, the Ministry of Culture appointed Petermann as acting director of the Staatsgalerie effective 1 April 1962; at the same time, however, it initiated a review of his loyalty to the constitution, prompted by his former membership in the KPD (Communist Party of Germany).

In 1963, Petermann curated an exhibition marking the 80th birthday of Erich Heckel. The artist created the woodcut "Thanks for the Commemoration on 31 July 1963" as a gesture of gratitude toward Stuttgart and all the other art museums that honored Heckel's work that year.

In 1968, Petermann acquired the Hugo Borst collection—comprising over 360 paintings, graphic works, and sculptures by 20th-century Swabian artists, as well as works of German Expressionism, French modernism, and the Stuttgart Secession—for the Staatsgalerie.

In 1966, Petermann was appointed professor. He retired in 1968.

=== Private Life ===
Erwin Petermann married to Helene Külbel.

== Honors ==
In 1969, Petermann received the Great Cross of Merit of the Federal Republic of Germany (Große Verdienstkreuz der Bundesrepublik Deutschland).

== Publications (selection) ==
Exhibition catalogs and others

- Formschnitte des Weisskunig. 1937. OCLC 1499538185.
- E. L. Kirchner: Aquarelle, Zeichnungen, Druckgraphik. Hatje. 1948.
- Käthe Kollwitz. 1950. OCLC 985598829.
- G. B. und D. Tiepolo. Stuttgarter Galerieverein. 1954.
- Alfred Lörcher: Bronzen und Terrakotten. Kölnischer Kunstverein. 1959.
- Sammlung Max Kade: Leihgabe der Max Kade-Foundation Inc. New York. Staatsgalerie Stuttgart. 1963. OCLC 1156799893.
- Erich Heckel. Zum 80. Geburtstag. 1963.
- Die Druckgraphik von Wilhelm Lehmbruck: Verzeichnis. Hatje. 1964. Inhaltsverzeichnis.
- Johann Gotthard Müller und die Kupferstecherschule der Hohen Carlsschule. 1959.
- Die Formschnitte des Weisskunig. Kohlhammer. 1956. pp. 57–148.
- Weisskunig. Maximilian I. Römisch-deutscher Kaiser. Kohlhammer. 1956. Inhaltsverzeichnis.
- Kaiser Maximilian I. Weisskunig. Vol. 2. W. Kohlhammer. 1956. OCLC 459423550.

== Literature ==
- Neues vom Weisskunig. Geschichte und Selbstdarstellung Kaiser Maximilians I. in Holzschnitten. Zur Erinnerung an Erwin Petermann. Graphische Sammlung Staatsgalerie Stuttgart. 1994.
