= Anita Halpin =

English communist and trade union activist of German-Jewish descent

Anita E. Halpin (born April 1944) is an English communist and trade union activist of German-Jewish descent who has been successful in having paintings returned to her that were looted by the Nazis from her grandfather, Alfred Hess, in the 1930s. Several works, such as Berlin Street Scene (1913) by Ernst Ludwig Kirchner and Nude by Karl Schmidt-Rottluff, have been returned to her and subsequently sold; the former sold at auction for £20.5 million to the Neue Galerie New York, which also paid over £1 million to Halpin for Nude.

== Early life and family ==
Anita E. Hess was born in April 1944, in New End Hospital, Hampstead, London. Her father was Hans Hess, an assistant curator at the former Leicester Museum and Art Gallery, who emigrated to England in 1933 via a Canadian internment camp. Her mother was Lillie Ester Hess (née Williams), an engineer's clerk with a German grandfather (on her father's side). They met through Jewish friends and were both described as being on the political left. Anita was an only child.

Her grandfather was the German-Jewish Alfred Hess, a shoe manufacturer in Erfurt, whose factory was Aryanised after 1933, who with his wife Tekla (1884–1968), née Pauson, had an art collection of around 4,000 works that contained important German Expressionist works and was looted by the Nazis in the 1930s. After her husband's death in 1931, Tekla Hess toured Europe, selling paintings from the collection to pay her way and sending others to her son Hans, before emigrating permanently to England in 1938. Hans tried to sell some of the paintings after the end of the Second World War but there were no buyers. There was an auction of family paintings at the Marlborough Gallery in 1977 following the death of Hans in 1975 and Lillie in 1976.

Anita was educated at the Queen Anne Grammar School in York and then read philosophy at University College, London before completing an MA in The History of Ideas at the University of Sussex. In 1974 she married Kevin Halpin who she met at a trade union rally. They have a son, Boris, a chef who is the father of two children.

== Career ==
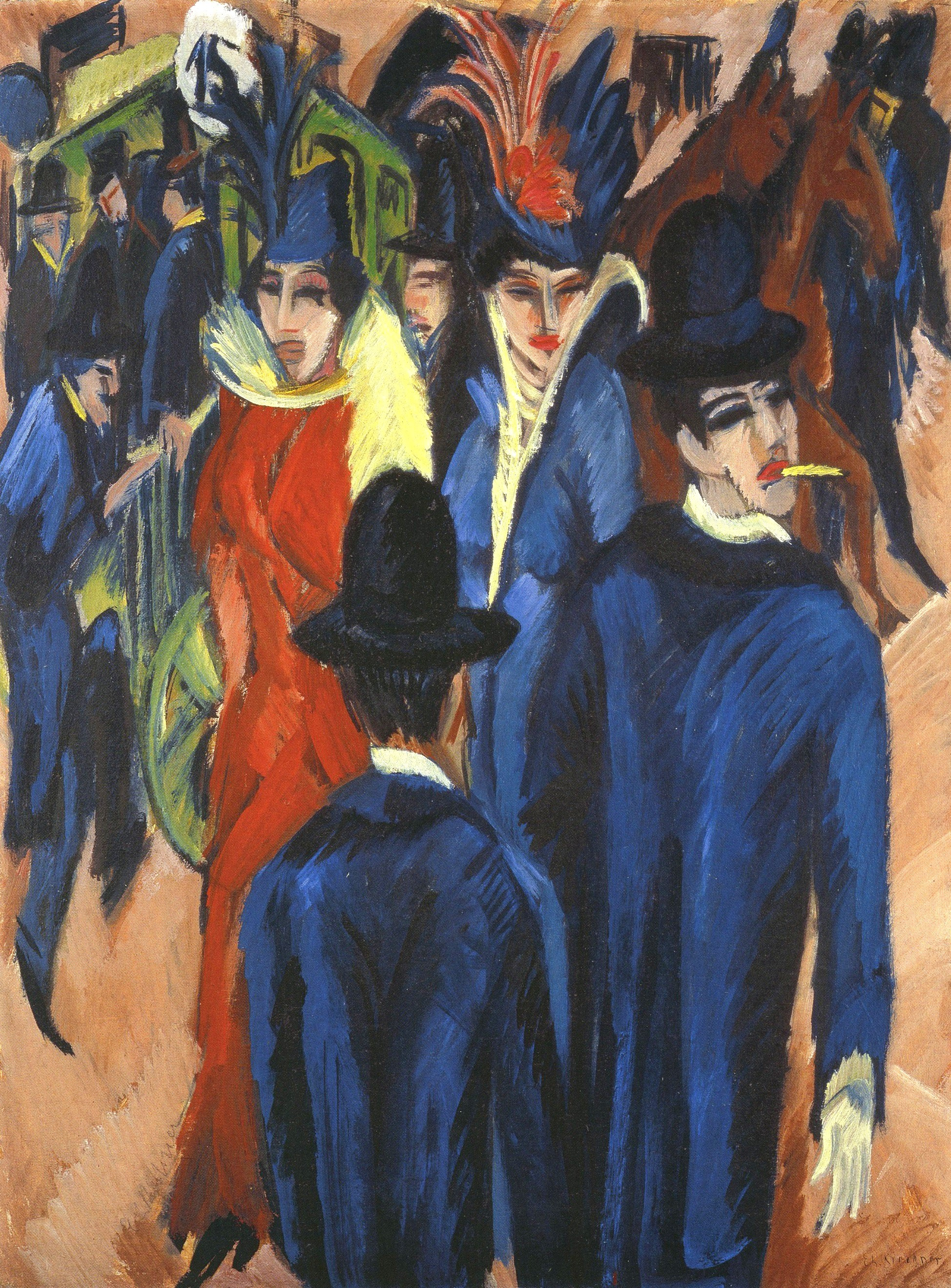
Berlin Street Scene, Ernst Ludwig Kirchner, oil on canvas, 1913

After her schooling, Halpin took a junior position in a German publishing company that was arranged through her father's contacts but she did not enjoy being in the country. She returned to London where she edited a medical journal, joined the National Union of Journalists, and began to get involved with trade unionism, causing her political beliefs to harden.

In the 1990s she became London district secretary of the Communist Party of Britain and soon after joined the executive committee before being elected as the national chairwoman in 2000. Her nickname there was "Stalin's granny" due to her hardline views. She has also been honorary treasurer for the National Union of Journalists and member of the Trades Union Congress General Council. In 1978 she stood in the Tower Hamlets London Borough Council Election in the Limehouse ward but was not successful, receiving 93 votes. In 2000 she stood for the London Assembly but also failed to be elected. In 2006 she was the chair of the Communist Party of Britain.

== Restitution of looted paintings ==
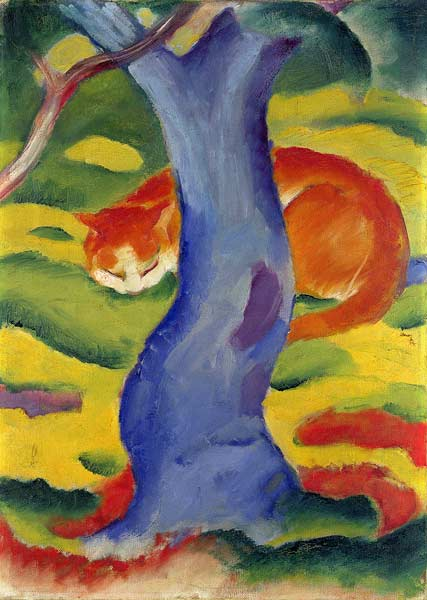
Cat Behind A Tree by Franz Marc

Halpin has made a number of claims for restitution of paintings that were looted from her grandfather, Alfred Hess, and his widow Tekla, by the Nazis in the 1930s.

In 2006, Berlin Street Scene (1913) by Ernst Ludwig Kirchner, which had hung in Berlin's Brücke Museum, was returned to Halpin as her grandfather's heir. It had been purchased by the museum using public funds, and had hung there for 26 years, where it was described as "one of Kirchner's best ever works," "one of the most important expressionist German paintings," and the "cornerstone" of the museum's collection. The restitution followed negotiations begun two years earlier, in September 2004, between Halpin and Berlin. Although efforts were made to keep the painting within the city, "financial constraints" prevented such an outcome. The painting was subsequently sold at Christie's auction house in New York City for £20.5 million in November 2006; it stayed in the city, being purchased by the Neue Galerie New York.

In 2016, she was successful in her claim to have Nude by German expressionist Karl Schmidt-Rottluff returned to her legal ownership by the Neue Galerie New York who had bought it for $800,000 in 1999. It was said to have disappeared from Halpin's grandmother's storage at the Cologne Art Association in 1939, after she fled Germany. The Neue Galerie immediately bought it back from Halpin for a price believed to be above $1 million.

Halpin has made claims for restitution on a number of other paintings by German expressionists, including The Little Blue Horse (1911) and Cat Behind A Tree (Katze hinter einem Baum (Kinderbild)) by Franz Marc, held by the Staatsgalerie Stuttgart and Sprengel Museum respectively; Barefoot Church I (1924) by Lyonel Feininger, also held by the Staatsgalerie; and Judgment Of Paris (1913) by Ernst Ludwig Kirchner, held by the Wilhelm Hack Museum.

Trade union offices
Preceded by John Toner	President of the National Union of Journalists; 1994–1995	Succeeded by Kyran Connolly
