= Carl Hagemann =

Chemist, businessman, I. G. Farben director and art collector (1867–1940)

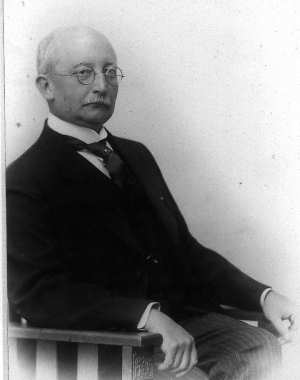
Portrait of Carl Hagemann

Carl Hagemann (April 9, 1867, in Essen – November 20, 1940, in Frankfurt am Main) was a German chemist, industrial manager and one of the most important German art collectors and patrons in the first half of the 20th century.

== Life ==
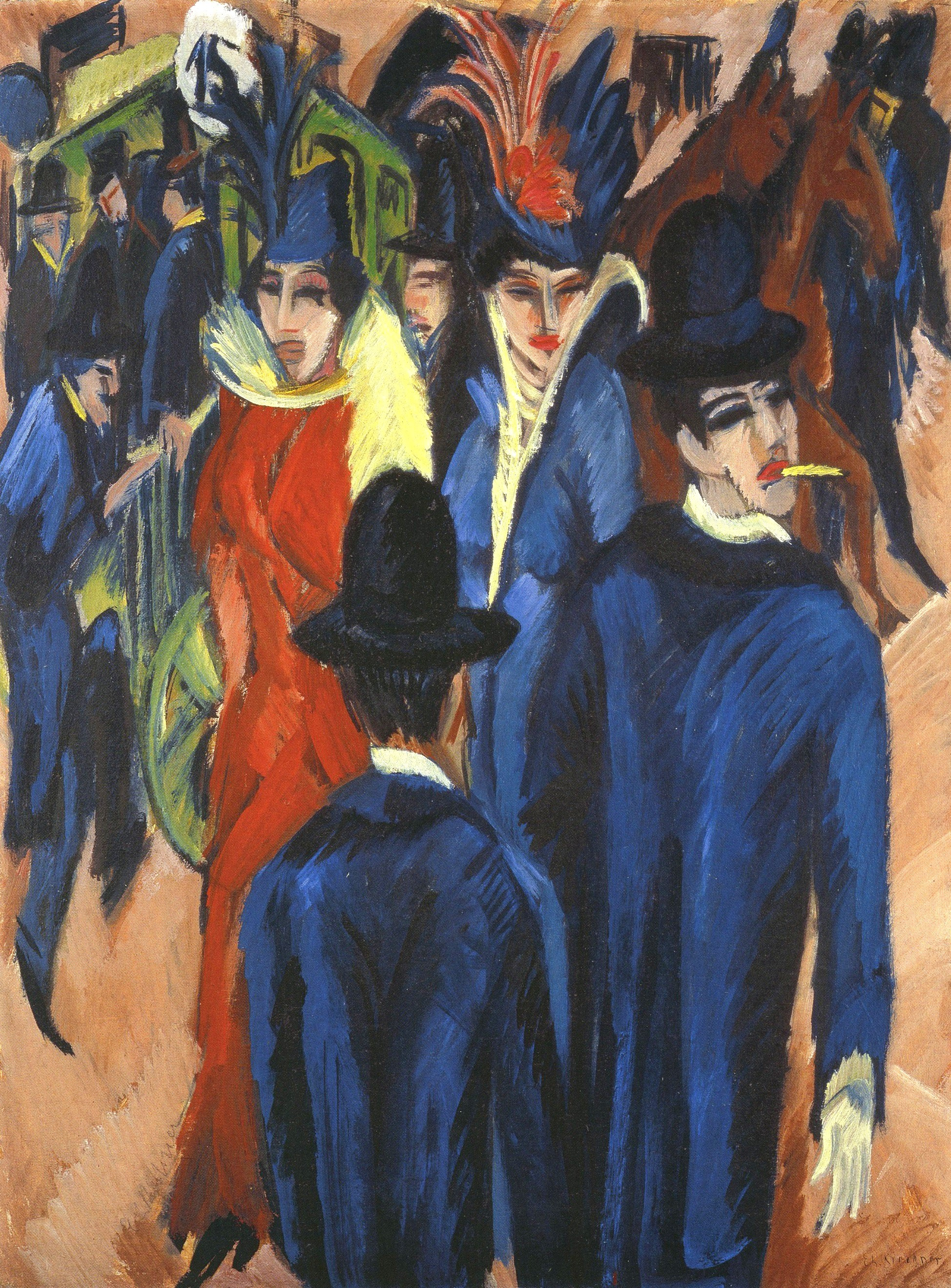
Berlin Street Scene (1913) by Ernst Ludwig Kirchner

Hagemann grew up in a middle-class family in Essen, where he attended the humanist Gymnasium am Burgplatz. He studied philosophy and chemistry from 1886 to 1890 in Tübingen, Hanover and Leipzig, and obtained a Ph.D. from the University of Leipzig in Johannes Wislicenus's team. Hagemann's ester, or ethyl-2-methyl-4-oxo-2-cyclohexenecarboxylate, is an organic compound that was first prepared and described by Hagemann in 1893. In 1894, he joined the Bayer color factories and made a career there. In 1920 he became technical director of the Cassella Farbwerke Mainkur Aktiengesellschaft in Frankfurt. Following their incorporation into the newly formed IG Farben in 1925, he became a member of the board. By the age of 65, he retired in 1932. He also wrote a book called Spiele der Voelker (Schuster und Loeffler, 1921); in this book he shows examples of dance and play in Japan, Africa, India and China.

Around the turn of the century, Hagemann started to collect art. His first collection objects were from popular graphics artists. In the second decade of the 20th century, first under the influence of his friend Ernst Gosebruch, the director of the Essen Museum of Art, Hagemann turned toward painters of Die Brücke and Emil Nolde. He was a friend of Ernst Ludwig Kirchner until his death in 1938.

In the course of four decades, Hagemann put together a very personal collection of paintings, prints and sculptures. A significant highlight of the pictures was Kirchner's "Berlin Street Scene" (Neue Galerie New York).

After his accidental death in 1940, he left a collection of about 1,900 art objects, including nearly a hundred paintings by Ernst Ludwig Kirchner, Karl Schmidt-Rottluff, Erich Heckel, Otto Mueller, Emil Nolde and others.

Since it was considered degenerate art during the time of the Nazi regime, Ernst Holzinger, then director of the Städel Museum in Frankfurt, took a high personal risk, as he hid the entire collection in the Städel. In this way, the collection survived the war largely unscathed.

Today, pictures from Hagemann's collection are found in museums around the world, and some of them are privately owned. The graphics and drawings were received as a gift by the Städel.

== See also ==
- Hagemann's ester
