= Hagemann's ester =

Names
- Preferred IUPAC name Ethyl 2-methyl-4-oxocyclohex-2-ene-1-carboxylate
- Other names Ethyl 2-methyl-4-oxocyclohex-2-enecarboxylate 4-Carbethoxy-3-methyl-2-cyclohexen-1-one

Identifiers
CAS Number	487-51-4
3D model (JSmol)	Interactive image
ChEMBL	ChEMBL84047
ChemSpider	71353
ECHA InfoCard	100.006.962
EC Number	207-657-4
PubChem CID	79020
UNII	5QME6N6BKP
CompTox Dashboard (EPA)	DTXSID801029631
- InChI: InChI=1S/C10H14O3/c1-3-13-10(12)9-5-4-8(11)6-7(9)2/h6,9H,3-5H2,1-2H3 Key: VLTANIMRIRCCOQ-UHFFFAOYSA-N; InChI=1/C10H14O3/c1-3-13-10(12)9-5-4-8(11)6-7(9)2/h6,9H,3-5H2,1-2H3 Key: VLTANIMRIRCCOQ-UHFFFAOYAX
- SMILES: O=C(OCC)C1C(=C\C(=O)CC1)/C

Properties
Chemical formula	C_{10}H_{14}O_{3}
Molar mass	182.219 g·mol^{−1}
Density	1.078 g/mL
Boiling point	268 to 272 °C (514 to 522 °F; 541 to 545 K)
- Except where otherwise noted, data are given for materials in their standard state (at 25 °C [77 °F], 100 kPa). Infobox references

Hagemann's ester, ethyl 2-methyl-4-oxo-2-cyclohexenecarboxylate, is an organic compound that was first prepared and described in 1893 by German chemist Carl Hagemann. The compound is used in organic chemistry as a reagent in the synthesis of many natural products including sterols, trisporic acids, and terpenoids.

== Preparation ==
=== Hagemann's approach ===
Methylene iodide and two equivalents of ethyl acetoacetate react in the presence of sodium methoxide to form the diethyl ester of 2,4-diacetyl pentane. This precursor is treated with base to induce cyclization. Finally, heat is applied to generate Hagemann's ester.

=== Knoevenagel's approach ===
Soon after Hagemann, Emil Knoevenagel described a modified procedure to produce the same intermediate diethyl ester of 2,4-diacetyl pentane using formaldehyde and two equivalents of ethyl acetoacetate which undergo condensation in the presence of a catalytic amount of piperidine.

=== Newman and Lloyd approach ===
2-Methoxy-1,3-butadiene and ethyl-2-butynoate undergo a Diels-Alder reaction to generate a precursor which is hydrolyzed to obtain Hagemann's ester. By varying the substituents on the butynoate starting material, this approach allows for different C2 alkylated Hagemann's ester derivatives to be synthesized.

=== Mannich and Forneau approach ===
==== Original ====
Methyl vinyl ketone, ethyl acetoacetate, and diethyl-methyl-(3-oxo-butyl)-ammonium iodide react to form a cyclic aldol product. Sodium methoxide is added to generate Hagemann's ester.

==== Variations ====
Methyl vinyl ketone and ethyl acetoacetate undergo aldol cyclization in the presence of catalytic pyrrolidinum acetate or Triton B or sodium ethoxide to produce Hagemann's ester. This variant is a type of Robinson annulation.

== Uses ==
Hagemann's ester has been used as a key building block in many syntheses. For example, a key intermediate for the fungal hormone trisporic acid was made by its alkylation and it has been used to make sterols. Other authors have used it in inverse-electron-demand Diels–Alder reactions leading to sesquiterpene dimers or in reactions forming simple derivatives.
