= Erna Schilling =

German nightclub dancer and model

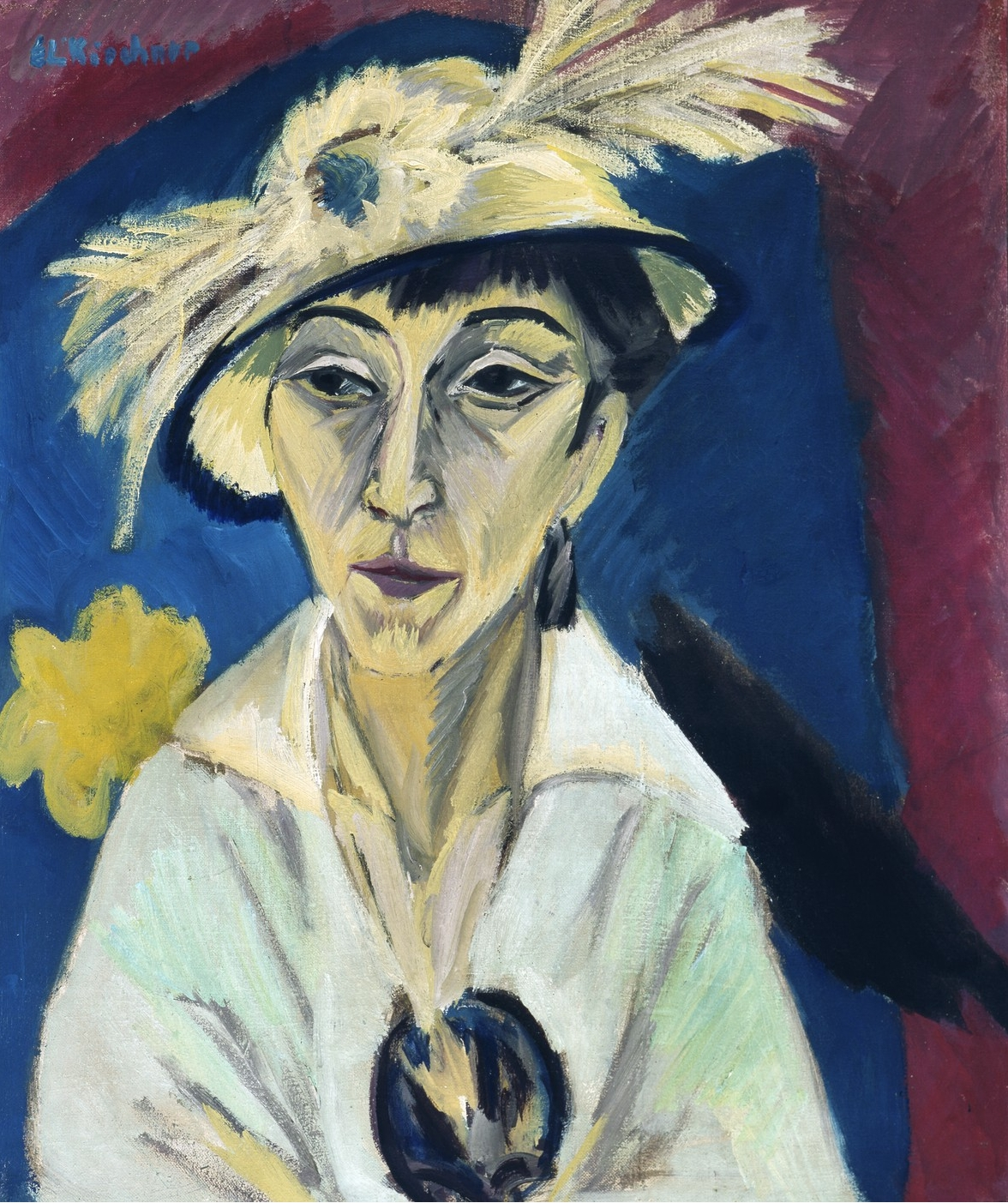
- Born: 1884; Berlin, Germany
- Died: 2 October 1945 (aged 60–61); Davos, Switzerland
- Occupations: dancer, artist's model

Erna Schilling (1884 – 2 October 1945) was a German craftswoman and artist's model.

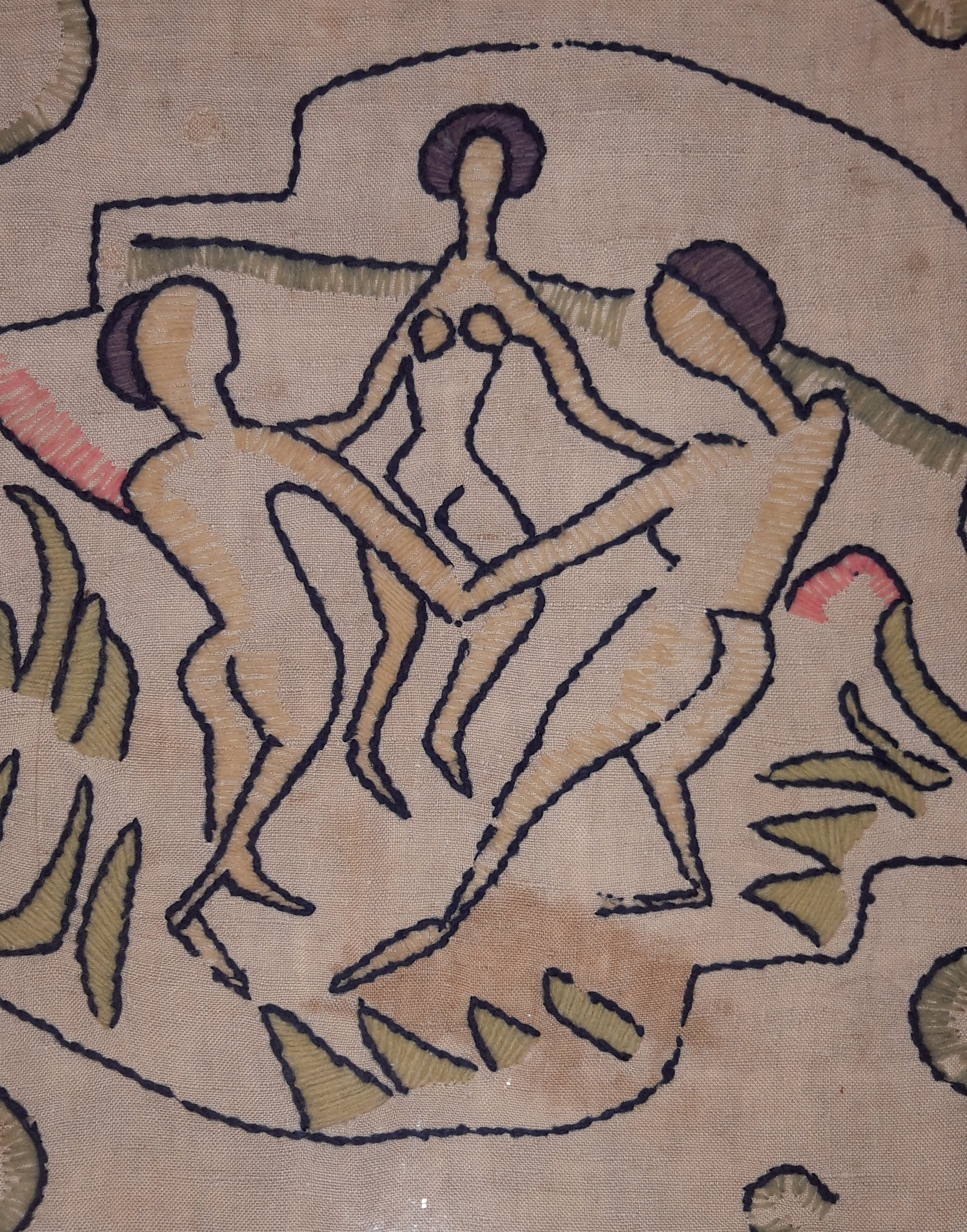
Embroidery by Erna Schilling

The daughter of a proofreader for a publishing company, she was born in Berlin. When she was eighteen, she left home with her younger sister Gerda. Gerda worked as a dancer in Berlin nightclubs, where the sisters met artist Ernst Ludwig Kirchner in 1911 or 1912. Schilling became his companion and preferred model. Through him, she met other members of the group of artists known as Die Brücke. Schilling was also a model used in paintings by Erich Heckel and Otto Mueller. She made embroideries for Kirchner's studio and gave dance performances there. She later looked after the artist's business after he suffered a mental breakdown in 1915. She moved to Switzerland with him in 1921 and became a Swiss citizen in 1937. Kirchner proposed marriage to her in June 1938. She was known as Frau Erna Kirchner following his suicide later that year.

She died in Davos in 1945.
