= Alfred Hess =

German Jewish industrialist and art collector

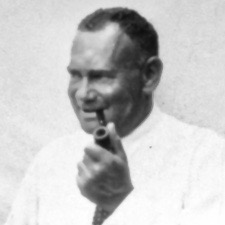
- Alfred Hess, 1928
- Born: 19 May 1879; Erfurt
- Died: 24 December 1931 (aged 52); Erfurt
- Known for: Industrialist and art collector
- Spouse(s): Thekla Hess, née Pauson

Alfred Hess (19 May 1879 – 24 December 1931) was a German Jewish industrialist and art collector.

== Career ==
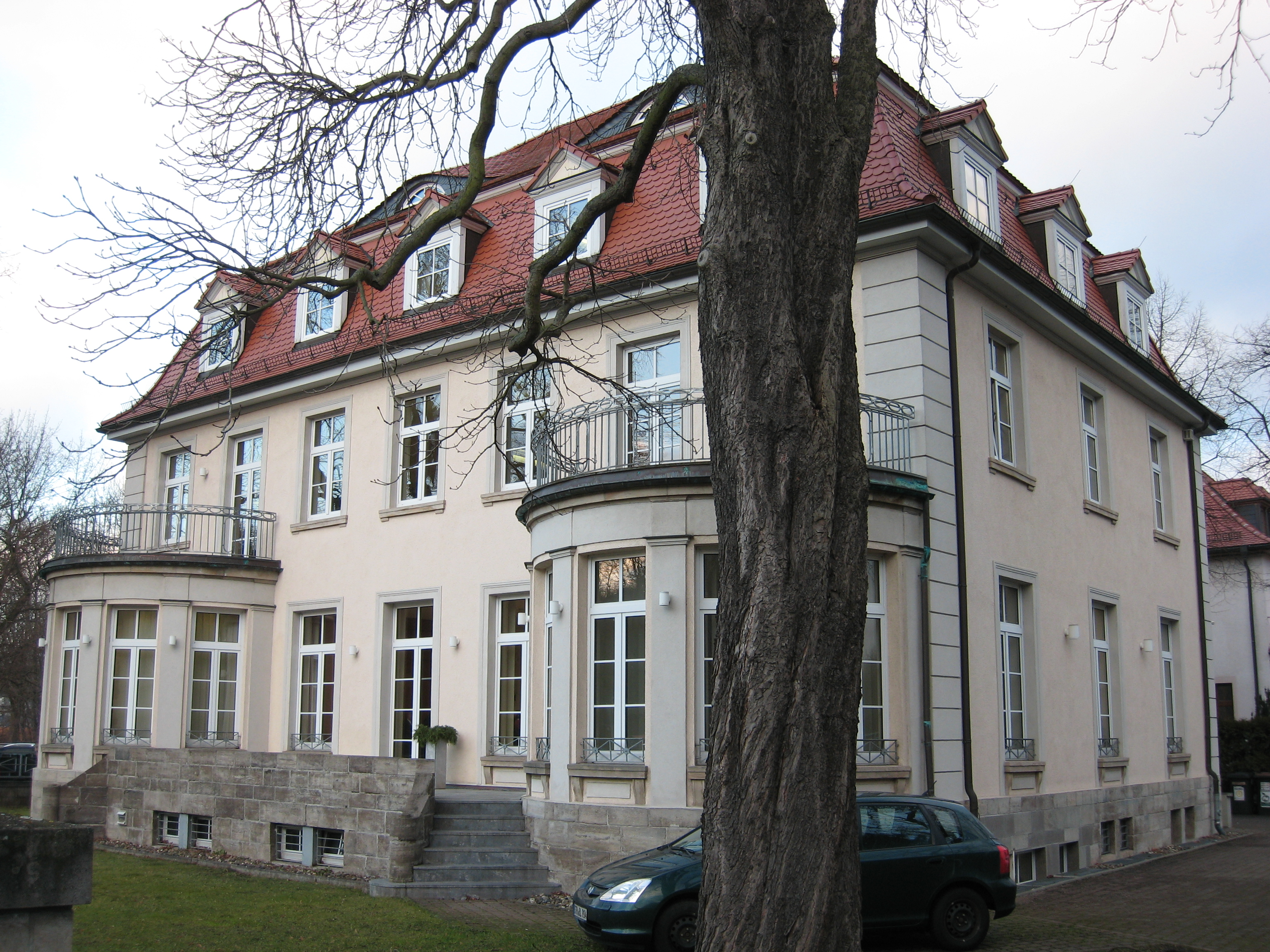
Hess's Villa in Erfurt

Hess was a shoe manufacturer in Erfurt, Thuringia. M & L Hess Schuhfabrik had four factories in Erfurt. He was keen on art and German expressionism. His portrait was made into a woodcut by Max Pechstein in 1919 when he was one of the artists who stayed at the Hess house. Hess made donations to local museums and his visitors' books were so lavishly decorated that illustrations were published as a book in 1957. Hess's factory was forcibly Aryanised under the Nazis.

A memorial plaque for Alfred Hess has been erected at the Hess villa in Alfred-Hess-Straße, Erfurt; the street was named after him in 1992.

== Art collection ==
With his wife Thekla (1884–1968), née Pauson, he had an art collection of around 4,000 works that contained important German Expressionist works.

Hess was a philanthropist, donating numerous artworks to museums in Germany. Gifts included the Johannes Driesch (1901 - 1930) drawing, Familie und Liebespaar, and Lyonel Feininger's Viadukt to the Museum für Kunst und Heimatgeschichte in Erfurt. He also loaned artworks to museums, such as Landungssteg by Lyonel Feininger and Tänzerinnen by Erich Henkel. These and other gifts and loans he made to museums were later seized by the Nazis, as were works from his private collection. Others were sold to finance the escape and survival of his family.

== Hess' death and the family's fate under the Nazis ==
Hess died in 1931, before the Nazis came to power. His widow Thekla, who emigrated from Germany to the UK via Switzerland, said that she was forced to sell paintings by the Gestapo. She was forced to deposit paintings with the Cologne Art Association in 1937, and was later told, falsely, that they had been destroyed. She joined her son Hans Hess in the UK in 1939.

Hans Hess helped Leicester Museum and Art Gallery create an exhibition of German Expressionist art in 1944. Leicester Museum bought or was given four artworks.

== Postwar ==
Hans Hess was appointed as an art assistant at Leicester shortly before the exhibition opened, then in 1947, he became keeper of art at York Art Gallery. Hans died in 1975 and his widow Lillie in 1976. In 1977 some of the family paintings were auctions at the Marlborough Gallery.

== Claims for restitution ==
The Hess heirs filed claims for restitution for looted artworks and forced sales. Several works, such as Berlin Street Scene (1913) by Ernst Ludwig Kirchner and Nude by Karl Schmidt-Rottluff, have been returned to his granddaughter and heir, Anita Halpin, and subsequently sold; the former sold at auction for £20.5 million to the Neue Galerie New York, which also paid over £1 million to Halpin for Nude. Restitution was opposed by Ludwig von Pufendorf, Wolfgang Henze of the Ernst Ludwig Kirchner Archive in Bern, Switzerland; and Bernd Schultz, managing shareholder of Berlin's Villa Grisebach auction house who stated that they thought that the Hess family sold because of the financial crisis unrelated to any Nazi pressure.
