= Serge Sabarsky =

American art collector

Serge Sabarsky (November 3, 1912 – February 23, 1996) was an art collector and art dealer of the 20th century.

== Life ==
Born as Siegfried Sabarsky in Vienna, Sarbarsky worked as a clown and set designer for the cabaret Simplicissimus before fleeing the Nazis in 1938, first to Paris, then, in 1939 to New York. There, he worked as an architectural designer before establishing a gallery for Austrian and German Expressionist art. In 1968 he opened a commercial art gallery on New York's Madison Avenue. He also collected artworks by Egon Schiele, Gustav Klimt and Oskar Kokoschka, most of which are now exhibited in the Neue Galerie New York.

Other artists in the Sabarsky collection included Wassily Kandinsky, Paul Klee, Ernst Ludwig Kirchner, Lyonel Feininger, Otto Dix, George Grosz.

Together with Ronald Lauder, he planned the Neue Galerie Museum in New York which was opened by Lauder after Sabarsky's death in 1996 in New York City. The museum café, reminiscent of a Viennese coffee house, bears his name in his honor.

== Lawsuits concerning Nazi-looted art ==
Sabarsky's name emerged in several lawsuits concerning restitution claims for Nazi-looted art concerning artworks by Grosz and Klimt, and there have been calls for more transparency regarding the collection.

In September 2023 the Manhattan D.A. arranged for the Sabarsky collection to return a Schiele painting that had been looted from Holocaust victim Fritz Grünbaum to his heirs.

== Publications ==
- Egon Schiele. 100 Zeichnungen und Aquarelle. Jesuitenkirche – Galerie der Stadt Aschaffenburg, Aschaffenburg 1994.
- Ich, Serge Sabarsky. Autobiographie. Verlag Holzhausen, Wien 1997, ISBN 3-900518-69-6
