= Neue Galerie New York =

Art museum in New York City

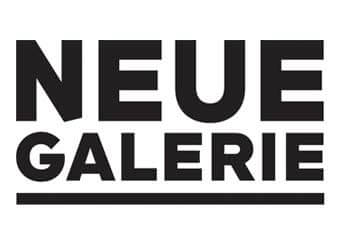

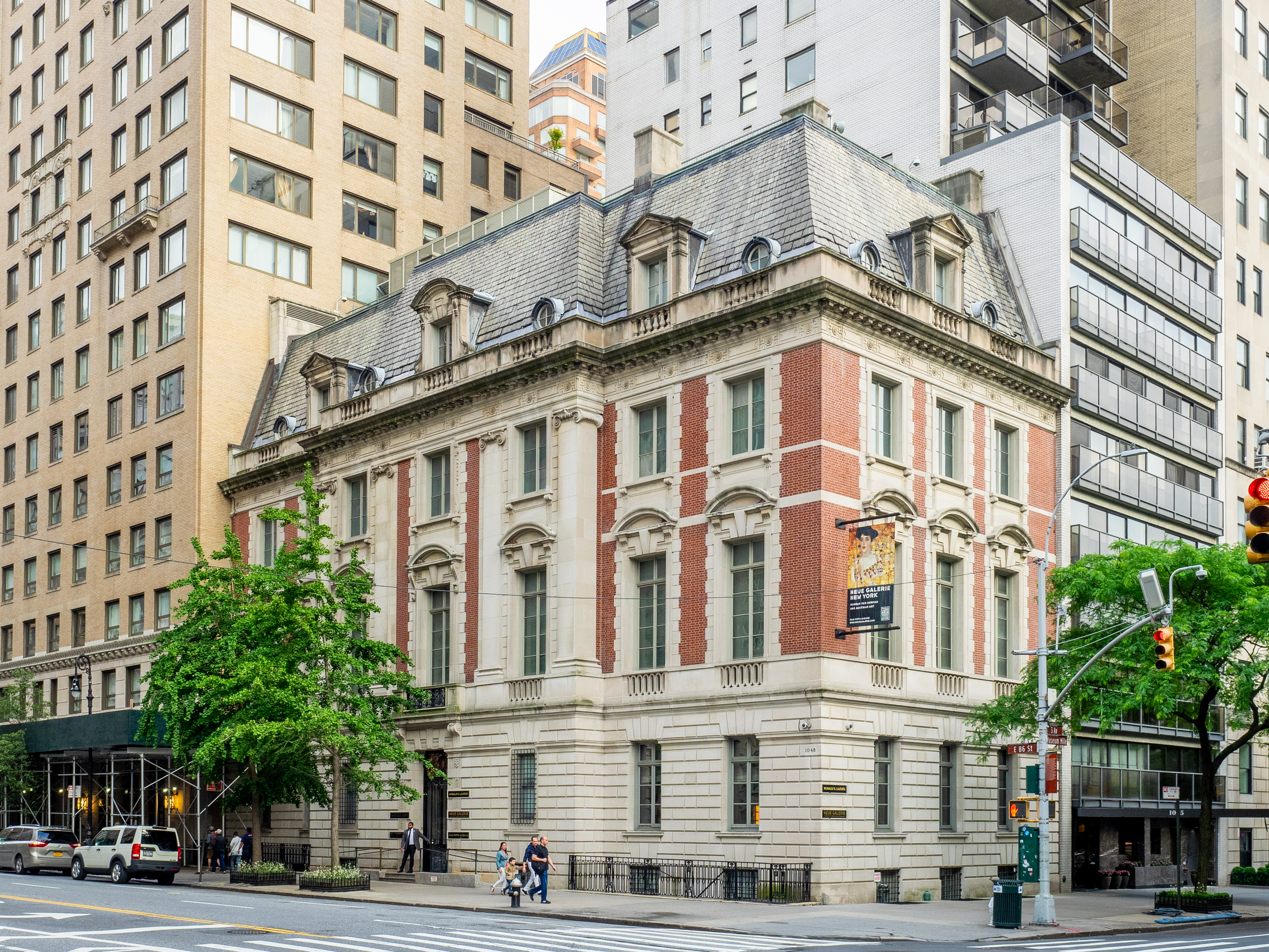

- Location of The Neue Galerie in New York City
- Established: November 16, 2001
- Location: 1048 5th Avenue and 86th Street, Manhattan, New York
- Coordinates: 40.7813°N 73.9603°W
- Director: Renée Price
- Public transit access: Subway: at 86th Street; Bus: M1, M2, M3, M4, M86
- Website: www.neuegalerie.org

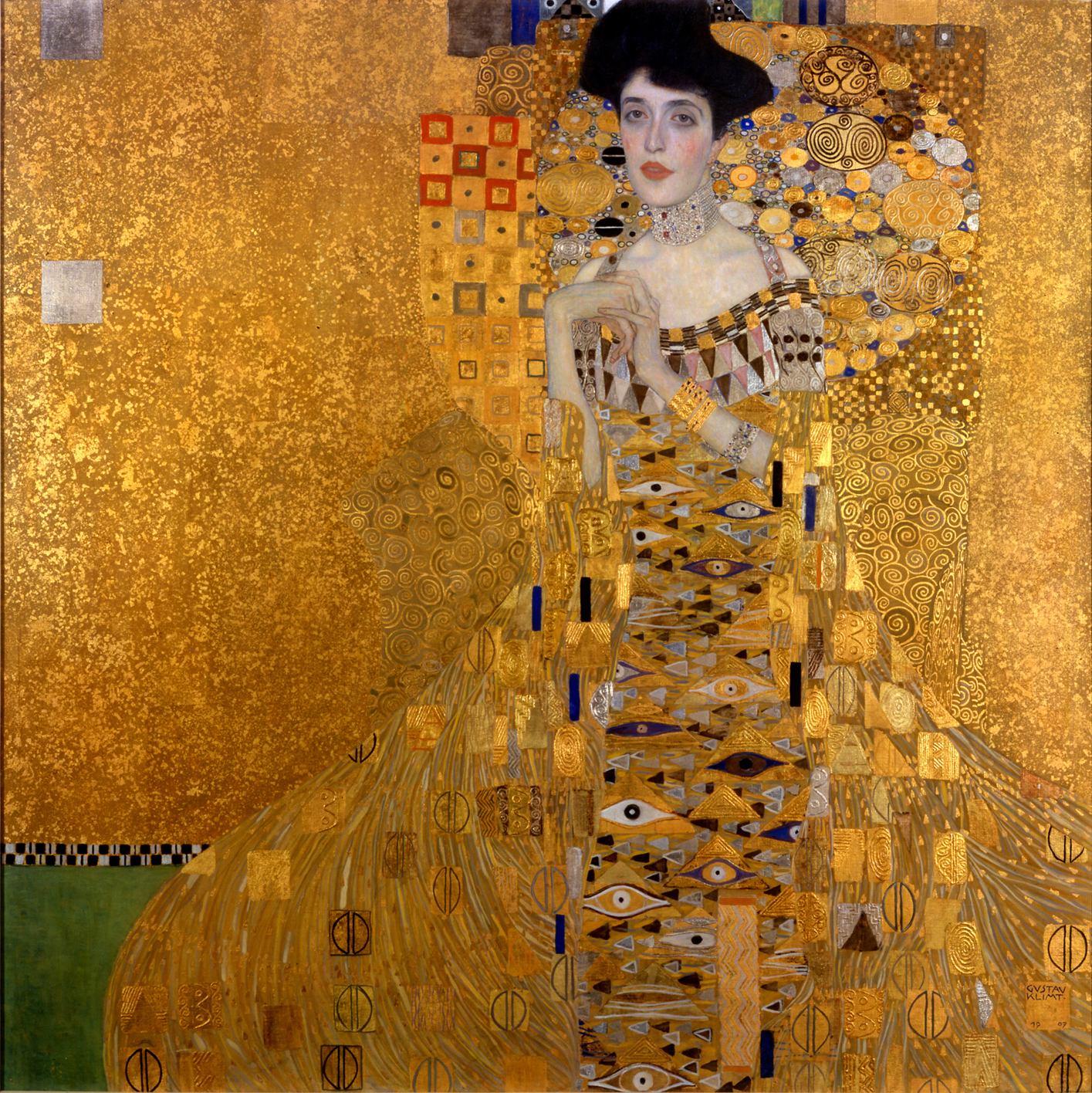
Portrait of Adele Bloch-Bauer I by Gustav Klimt used to hang in a museum in Vienna and was restituted to its owner who sold it to the Neue Galerie in 2006

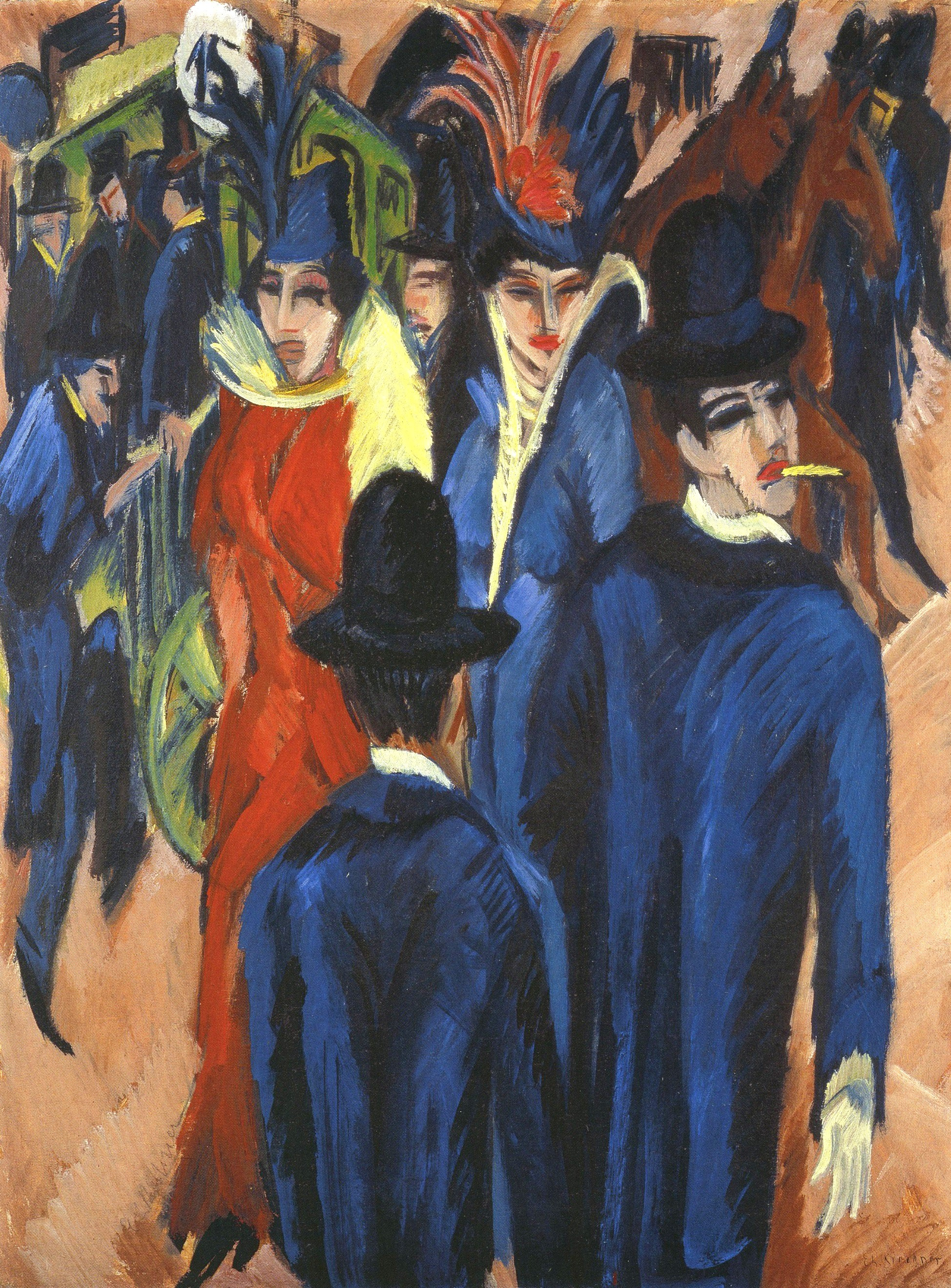
Berlin Street Scene by Ernst Ludwig Kirchner was another painting that used to hang in a German museum that was restituted and bought by the Neue Galerie in 2007

The Neue Galerie New York (German for "New Gallery") is a museum of early twentieth-century German and Austrian art and design on the Upper East Side of Manhattan in New York City. It is located in the William Starr Miller House at 86th Street and Fifth Avenue. Established in 2001, it is one of the most recent additions to New York City's Museum Mile, on Fifth Avenue. In 2026, the museum and the Metropolitan Museum of Art announced that the two institutions would merge in 2028.

== History ==
The museum was first conceived by two close friends: art dealer and museum exhibition organizer Serge Sabarsky, and businessman, philanthropist, and art collector Ronald S. Lauder. The two men shared a passionate commitment to early twentieth-century German and Austrian art and design. The two met in 1967, just before Sabarsky opened his Serge Sabarsky Gallery at 987 Madison Avenue. That gallery quickly earned a reputation as New York's leading gallery for Austrian and German Expressionist art, and Lauder was a frequent visitor and client.

Over the years, the two discussed opening a museum to showcase the very best work from the period. When Sabarsky died in 1996, Lauder chose to carry on the task of creating Neue Galerie New York, as a tribute to his friend. The museum opened in November 2001. In May 2026, the museum and the Metropolitan Museum of Art announced that the two institutions would merge in 2028, with the Neue to be renamed the Met Ronald S. Lauder Neue Galerie and referred to as the Met Neue Galerie.

== Collection ==
The collection of the Neue Galerie is divided into two sections. The second floor of the museum houses works of fine art and decorative art from early twentieth-century Austria, including paintings by Gustav Klimt, Oskar Kokoschka, and Egon Schiele and decorative objects by the artisans of the Wiener Werkstaette and their contemporaries. The third floor exhibits various German works from the same era, including art movements such as Der Blaue Reiter (The Blue Rider), Die Brücke (The Bridge), and the Bauhaus. Featured artists on this floor include Wassily Kandinsky, Paul Klee, Ernst Ludwig Kirchner, Lyonel Feininger, Otto Dix, and George Grosz.

In 2006, Lauder purchased Klimt's painting Portrait of Adele Bloch-Bauer I from Maria Altmann on behalf of the Neue Galerie. Citing a confidentiality agreement, Lauder would only confirm that the purchase price was more than the last record price of US$104.2 million US for Picasso's 1905 Boy With a Pipe. The press reported the price for the Klimt at US$135 million, which would make it at that time the most expensive painting ever sold. It has been on display at the museum since July 2006.

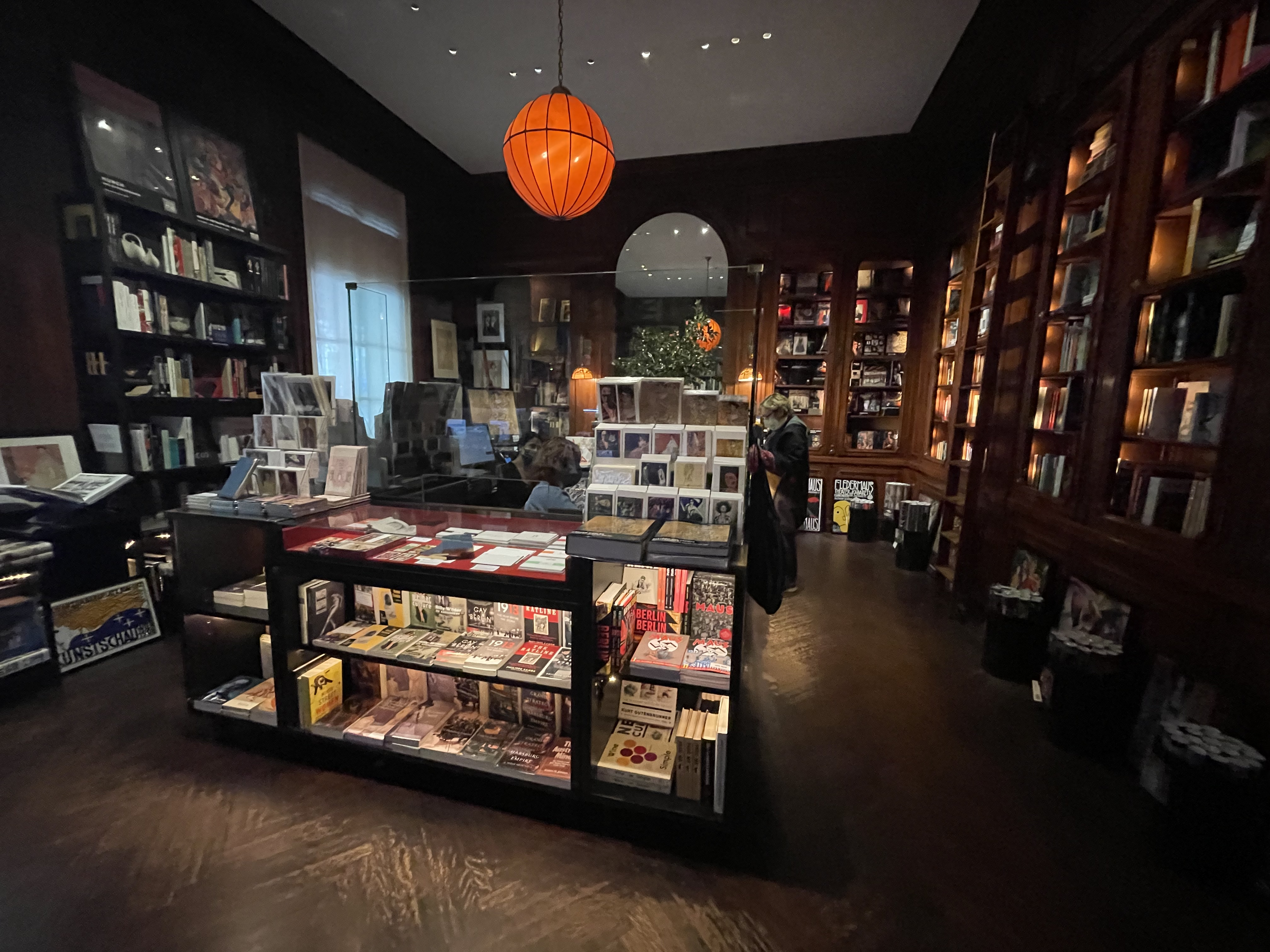
Gift Shop, Neue Galerie New York City

== Facility ==
The museum is housed in the former William Starr Miller House, a Louis XIII/Beaux-Arts structure located on the corner of Fifth Avenue and 86th Street. It has 4,300 square feet of exhibition space and a maximum occupancy of 375 people.

Selldorf Architects was responsible for the complete renovation and conversion into a museum. In addition to its gallery spaces, the museum also contains a bookstore, design shop, and two Viennese cafés, Café Sabarsky and Café Fledermaus.

Café Sabarsky, which bears the name of Neue Galerie co-founder Serge Sabarsky, draws inspiration from Viennese cafés. It is outfitted with period objects, including lighting fixtures by Josef Hoffmann, furniture by Adolf Loos, and banquettes that are upholstered with a 1912 Otto Wagner fabric. A Bösendorfer grand piano graces one corner of the Café, and is used for all cabaret, chamber, and classical music performances at the museum.

Café Sabarsky was operated by restaurateur Kurt Gutenbrunner until 2020. Since at least 2022, Christopher Engel has been the executive chef.

== Management ==
As of April 2020, the museum is headed by President and founder Ronald S. Lauder as well as an advisory Board of Trustees. Since the museum's opening it has been led by Renée Price, Director, who was born in Vienna, Austria, and was formerly the Director of the Serge Sabarsky Gallery.

== Past exhibitions ==
- Madame d'Ora opened on February 20, 2020, and ran through March 12, 2020. The exhibition's run-time was cut short by the closing of the museum due to the worldwide COVID-19 pandemic. This show was curated by Dr. Monika Faber and featured the work of the photographer Madame d'Ora otherwise known as Dora Kallmus.
- Ernst Ludwig Kirchner opened on October 3, 2019, and ran through January 13, 2020. This exhibition featured the work of Ernst Ludwig Kirchner and was organized by Neue Galerie and co-curated by Jill Lloyd and Janis Staggs.
- Eclipse of the Sun: Art of the Weimar Republic opened on May 23, 2019, and ran through September 2, 2019. This exhibition featured George Grosz’s monumental 1926 painting Eclipse of the Sun, which was on special loan from the Heckscher Museum of Art in Huntington, New York.
- The Self-Portrait, From Schiele to Beckmann opened on February 28, 2019, and ran through June 24, 2019. This exhibition featured works primarily from Austria and Germany made between 1900 and 1945. There were approximately 70 self-portraits by more than 30 artists, loans from public and private collections worldwide.
- Focus: Wiener Werkstätte Jewelry opened on October 4, 2018, and ran through May 13, 2019.
- Gustav Klimt and Egon Schiele 1918 Centenary opened on June 28, 2018, and ran through January 21, 2019.
- Franz Marc and August Macke: 1909-1914 opened on October 4, 2018, and ran through January 21, 2019. This exhibition featured approximately 70 paintings and works on paper by Franz Marc and August Macke, loans from public and private collections worldwide.
- Before the Fall: German and Austrian Art of the 1930s opened on March 8, 2018, and ran through May 28, 2018. The exhibition was organized by Dr. Olaf Peters, University Professor at Martin-Luther-Universität Halle-Wittenberg, and served as the third show in a trilogy of exhibitions curated by Peters that focused on German history. The first of these three shows, "Degenerate Art: The Attack on Modern Art in Nazi Germany 1937," organized in 2014, examined the infamous traveling exhibition "Entartete Kunst" mounted by the National Socialist regime. The exhibition was an enormous popular and critical success. The second show, "Berlin Metropolis: 1918-1933" on view in 2015, explored the critical role played by the city of Berlin in the growth of modern culture.
- Wiener Werkstätte 1903-1932: The Luxury of Beauty opened on October 26, 2017, and ran through January 29, 2018. This exhibition was a major retrospective devoted to the Wiener Werkstätte and was curated by Dr. Christian Witt-Dörring, Curator of Decorative Arts for Neue Galerie New York.
- Richard Gerstl opened on June 29, 2017, and ran through September 25, 2017. This exhibition was the first museum retrospective in the United States devoted to the work of the Austrian Expressionist Richard Gerstl and featured approximately 55 paintings and works on paper, including portraits, frontal nude figures, highly gestural group portraits, landscapes, and comparative works by Gerstl's artistic contemporaries.
- Alexei Jawlensky opened on February 16, 2017, and ran through May 29, 2017. This exhibition was the first full museum retrospective in the United States devoted to the work of the Russian-born Expressionist artist Alexei Jawlensky.
- Klimt and the Women of Vienna's Golden Age, 1900-1918 opened on September 22, 2016, and ran through January 16, 2017. The exhibition was organized by Gustav Klimt scholar Dr. Tobias G. Natter and featured 12 paintings, 40 drawings, 40 works of decorative art, and vintage photographs of Klimt, drawn from public and private collections worldwide.
- German Advertising Posters of the Early 20th Century opened on October 22, 2015, and ran through September 5, 2016.
- Munch and Expressionism opened on February 18, 2016, and ran through June 13, 2016. This exhibition examined Edvard Munch’s influence on his German and Austrian contemporaries, as well as their influence upon him. The Neue Galerie was the sole venue for the exhibition and was organized in partnership with The Munch Museum, Oslo.
- The Expressionist Nude opened on February 18, 2016, and ran through June 13, 2016. The show was organized by Janis Staggs, Director of Curatorial and Manager of Publications at Neue Galerie New York.
- Berlin Metropolis: 1918-1933 opened on October 1, 2015, and ran through January 4, 2016. The exhibition was organized by Dr. Olaf Peters, Professor of Art History at the Martin-Luther Universität Halle-Wittenberg, and was devoted to the art of Berlin during the Weimar period.
- Gustav Klimt and Adele Bloch-Bauer: The Woman in Gold opened on April 2, 2015, and ran through September 7, 2015. This exhibition coincides with the opening of the historical drama "Woman in Gold," starring Helen Mirren as Adele Bloch-Bauer's niece Maria Altmann, and Ryan Reynolds as lawyer Randol Schoenberg. The Weinstein Company released the film in U.S. theaters on April 3, 2015.
- Russian Modernism: Cross-Currents of German and Russian Art, 1907-1917 opened on May 14, 2015, and ran through August 31, 2015. This is the first exhibition at an American museum to focus exclusively on the important artistic links between these two countries, featuring works by artists Natalia Goncharova, Erich Heckel, Alexei von Jawlensky, Vasily Kandinsky, Ernst Ludwig Kirchner, Mikhail Larionov, and Gabriele Münter, among others.
- Egon Schiele: Portraits opened on October 9, 2014, and ran through April 20, 2015. This was the first exhibition at an American museum to focus exclusively on portraiture in Egon Schiele's work.
- Degenerate Art: The Attack on Modern Art in Nazi Germany, 1937 opened on March 13, 2014, and ran through September 1, 2014. This exhibition was the first major U.S. museum exhibition devoted to the infamous display of modern art by the Nazis since the 1991 presentation at the Los Angeles County Museum of Art.
- Posters of the Vienna Secession, 1898-1918 opened on February 20, 2014, and ran through September 1, 2014.
- Vasily Kandinsky: From the Blaue Reiter to the Bauhaus, 1910-1925 opened on October 3, 2013, and ran through February 10 2014. The exhibition featured over 80 works, including large-scale paintings, rare drawings, and decorative objects. These were drawn from the permanent collection of the Neue Galerie, and augmented by major loans from The Museum of Modern Art, The Solomon R. Guggenheim Museum, Fondation Beyeler, Walker Art Center, and Centre Georges Pompidou.
- The Modern Poster in Germany opened on October 3, 2013, and ran through February 10, 2014. This exhibition featured over thirty posters from the late nineteenth and early twentieth century, including work by Lucian Bernhard, Thomas Theodor Heine, Ludwig Hohlwein, Julius Klinger, Johann Thorn-Prikker, and Oskar Schlemmer.
- Koloman Moser: Designing Modern Vienna 1897-1907 opened on May 23, 2013, and ran through September 2, 2013. This retrospective of the work of Koloman Moser was curated by Dr. Christian Witt-Dörring, Curator of Decorative Arts for Neue Galerie New York. This exhibition was co-organized by the Neue Galerie New York and the Museum of Fine Arts, Houston, TX.
- German and Austrian Decorative Arts from the Jugendstil to the Bauhaus: the Harry C. Sigman Gift opened on February 27, 2013, and ran through April 23, 2013. This exhibition featured a major gift of over 100 works of German and Austrian decorative arts from Los Angeles-based attorney and collector Harry C. Sigman.
- Ferdinand Hodler: View to Infinity opened on September 20, 2012, and ran through January 7, 2013. At the time, this exhibition was the largest American exhibition devoted to the Swiss artist, Ferdinand Hodler. The exhibition included 65 paintings and 20 drawings from both public and private collections worldwide, as well as furniture designed by Josef Hoffmann for the Hodler apartment. The Musée d’art et d’histoire in Geneva was responsible for the loan of the drawings.
- Gustav Klimt: 150th Anniversary Celebration opened on May 24, 2012, and ran through August 27, 2012.
- Heinrich Kuehn and his American Circle: Alfred Stieglitz and Edward Steichen opened on April 26, 2012, and ran through August 27, 2012. This exhibition focused on the work of the Austrian photographer Heinrich Kuehn. The organizing curator for the project was Dr. Monika Faber.
- The Ronald S. Lauder Collection: Selections from the 3rd Century BC to the 20th Century/Germany, Austria, and France opened on October 27, 2011, and ran through April 2, 2012. The exhibition focused on six areas: medieval art, arms and armor, Old Master paintings, 19th- and 20th-century drawings, fine and decorative art of Vienna 1900, and modern and contemporary art. Among the artists represented were Joseph Beuys, Constantin Brancusi, Paul Cézanne, Vasily Kandinsky, Anselm Kiefer, Gustav Klimt, Henri Matisse, Pablo Picasso, and Gerhard Richter.
- Vienna 1900: Style and Identity opened on February 24, 2011, and ran through August 8, 2011. The show was curated by Christian Witt-Dörring and Jill Lloyd and featured works by artists Gustav Klimt, Oskar Kokoschka, and Egon Schiele, as well as furniture by architects Otto Wagner and Adolf Loos, and decorative artists Josef Hoffmann and Koloman Moser.
- Postcards of the Wiener Werkstätte: Selections from the Leonard A. Lauder Collection opened on October 7, 2010, and ran through January 17, 2011. This was the first major museum exhibition ever held in the United States devoted exclusively to the postcards produced by the Wiener Werkstätte. The show was drawn exclusively from The Leonard A. Lauder Collection and coincided with a gift to the Neue Galerie of nearly 1,000 postcards produced by the Wiener Werkstätte from 1907 to 1920.
- Franz Xaver Messerschmidt 1736-1783: From Neoclassicism to Expressionism opened on September 16, 2010, and ran through January 10, 2011. This was the first exhibition in the United States devoted exclusively to Franz Xaver Messerschmidt. The exhibition is organized by Guilhem Scherf, chief curator of sculpture at the Musée du Louvre. After its debut at the Neue Galerie, the show traveled to the Louvre, where it was on view from January 26, 2011, to April 25, 2011. This was the first collaboration between the Neue Galerie and the Louvre.
- Otto Dix opened on March 11, 2010, and ran through August 30, 2010. This was the first solo museum exhibition of works by Otto Dix ever held in North America. Organized by Olaf Peters, Professor of Modern Art History and Art Theory at the Martin-Luther-University Halle-Wittenberg, the show premiered at the Neue Galerie, then traveled to the Montreal Museum of Fine Arts.
- From Klimt to Klee: Masterworks from the Serge Sabarsky Collection opened on October 15, 2009, and ran through February 15, 2010. The exhibition presented works from the Sabarsky Collection, founded by Serge Sabarsky, with examples by Austrian artists Gustav Klimt, Egon Schiele, and Oskar Kokoschka, and German artists Max Beckmann, Otto Dix, Ernst Ludwig Kirchner, among many others.
- Focus: Oskar Kokoschka opened on July 16, 2009, and ran through October 5, 2009. The exhibition presented eight portrait paintings and over 80 works on paper by the artist from the collection of the Neue Galerie.
- Brücke: The Birth of Expressionism, 1905–1913 opened on February 26, 2009, and ran through June 29, 2009. Featuring more than 100 paintings, sculptures, and works on paper, it was the first major exhibition in the United States to focus on the pioneering artists of the Expressionist group known as the Brücke. The show was organized by Reinhold Heller, a Neue Galerie board member and internationally recognized scholar of German Expressionism. The Neue Galerie was the sole venue for the show.
- Alfred Kubin: Drawings, 1897–1909 opened September 25, 2008, and ran through January 26, 2009. It was the first museum exhibition of the macabre works of Austrian artist Alfred Kubin ever held in the United States. The show was organized by Annegret Hoberg, curator of the Städtische Galerie im Lenbachhaus, Munich, and it included more than 100 of Kubin's earliest works on paper.
- Gustav Klimt: The Ronald S. Lauder and Serge Sabarsky Collections opened October 18, 2007, and ran through June 30, 2008 and it filled all the gallery spaces in the museum. Featuring highlights from the private collections of the museum's cofounders, it comprised eight paintings and over 120 works on paper by the Austrian avant-garde artist Gustav Klimt. The show also included an installation of the original furniture from the receiving parlor of Klimt's studio at Josefstädter Strasse 21, and a recreation of one of Klimt's masterpieces, the Beethoven Frieze.
- Ernst Ludwig Kirchner: Berlin Street Scene opened July 26, 2007, and ran through September 17, 2007. It was an exhibition focusing on a painting by Ernst Ludwig Kirchner, which was restituted to Anita Halpin in November 2006 and which joined the collection of the Neue Galerie at the beginning of the summer of 2007. In addition to Berlin Street Scene, the exhibition featured a Kirchner sculpture, Standing Girl, Karyatide (1909–10), as well as a selection of paintings and works on paper that survey Berlin during the period; by Kirchner, Otto Dix, George Grosz, and Christian Schad.
- Van Gogh and Expressionism opened March 22, 2007, and ran through July 2, 2007. It explored the crucial influence of Vincent van Gogh on German and Austrian Expressionism. More than 80 paintings and drawings were on view, including a number of major canvases by Van Gogh, as well as important paintings by Gustav Klimt, Egon Schiele, Oskar Kokoschka, Alexej von Jawlensky, Franz Marc, Wassily Kandinsky, Ernst Ludwig Kirchner, Emil Nolde, and others. This exhibition, organized by curator Jill Lloyd, the well-known scholar of Expressionism, filled all the gallery spaces in the museum.
