= Brücke Museum =

Museum in Berlin, Germany

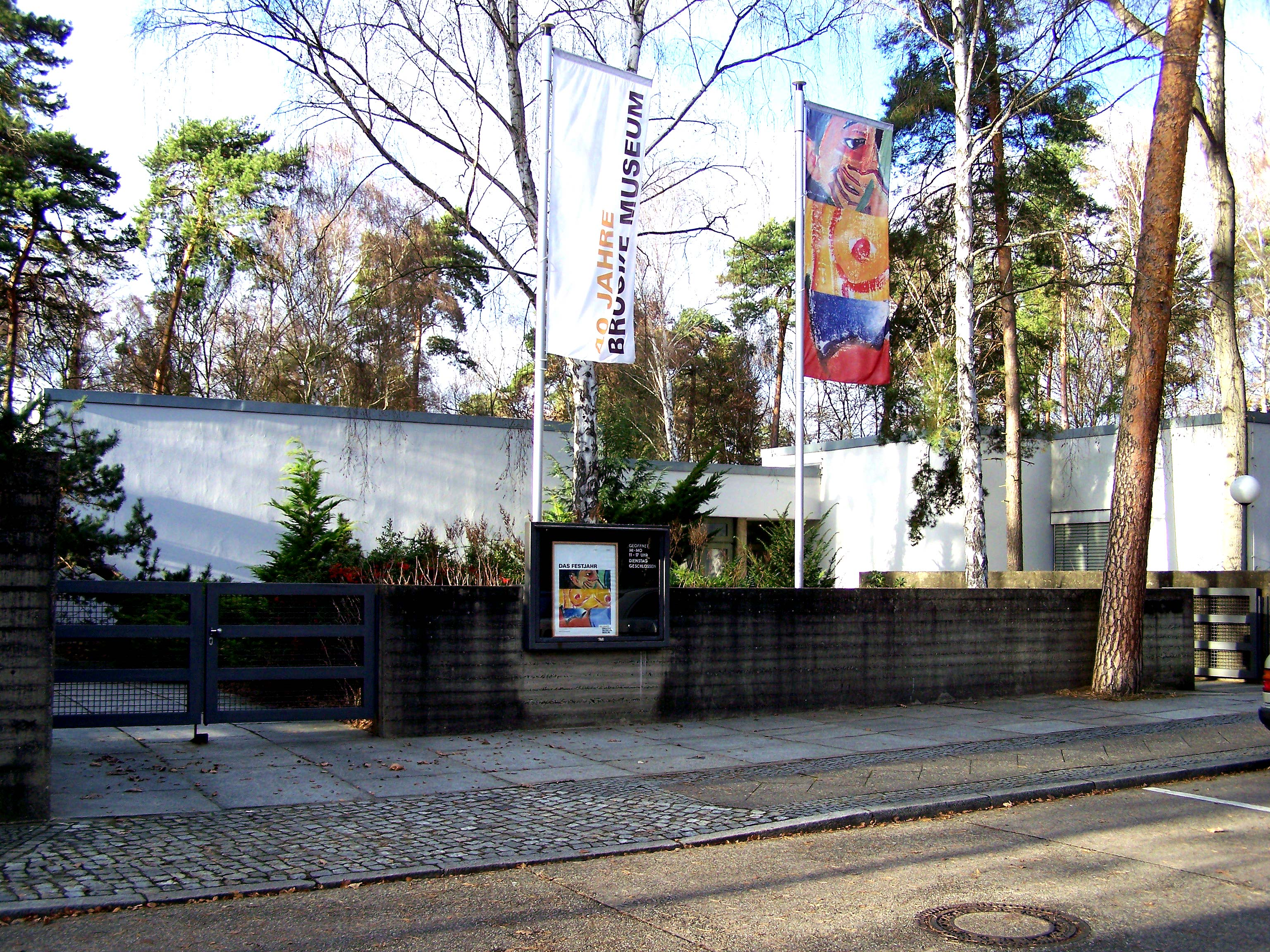
The Brücke Museum in Berlin

Brücke Museum, Berlin

The Brücke Museum in Berlin houses the world's largest collection of works by members of the group Die Brücke ("The Bridge"), an early 20th-century German expressionist movement.

== Collection ==
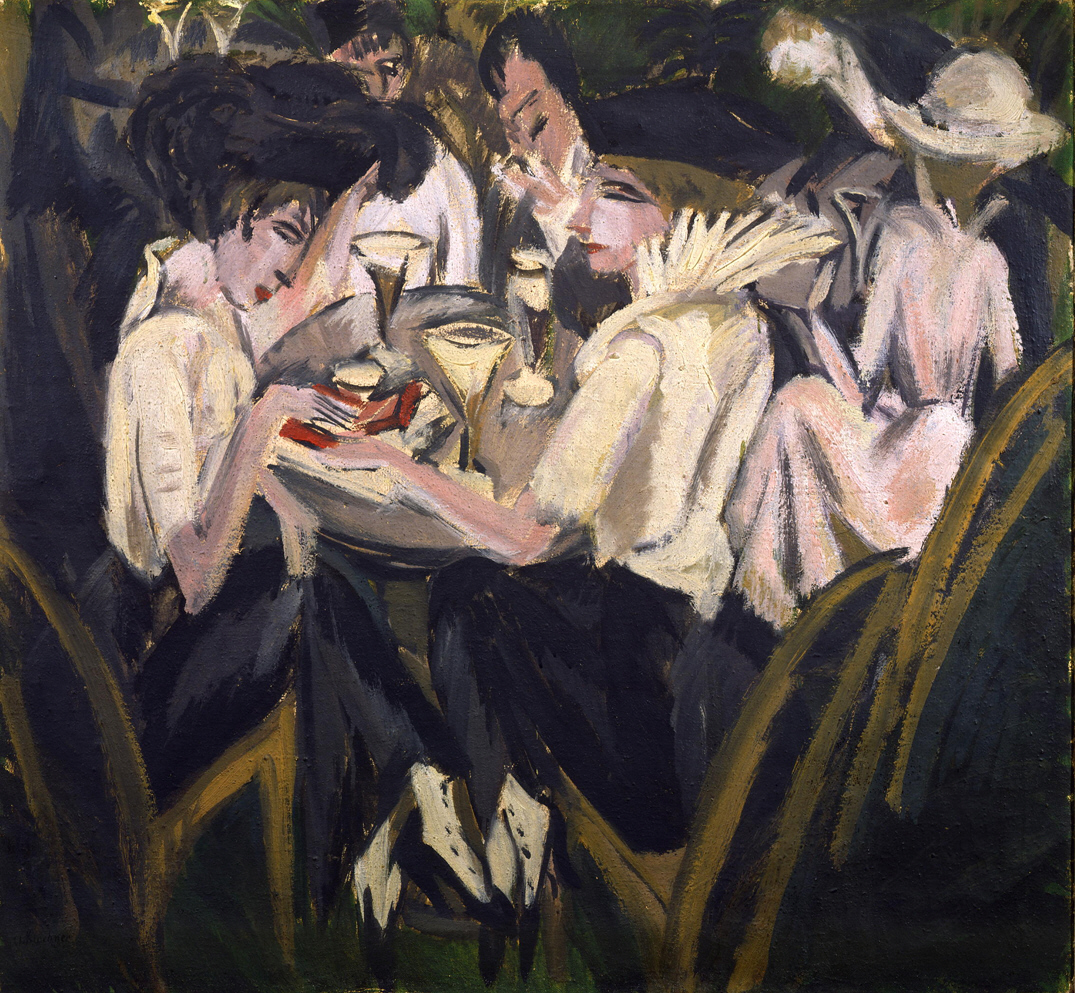
Ernst Ludwig Kirchner: In the garden of the coffee-house (in German: Im Cafégarten, 1914)

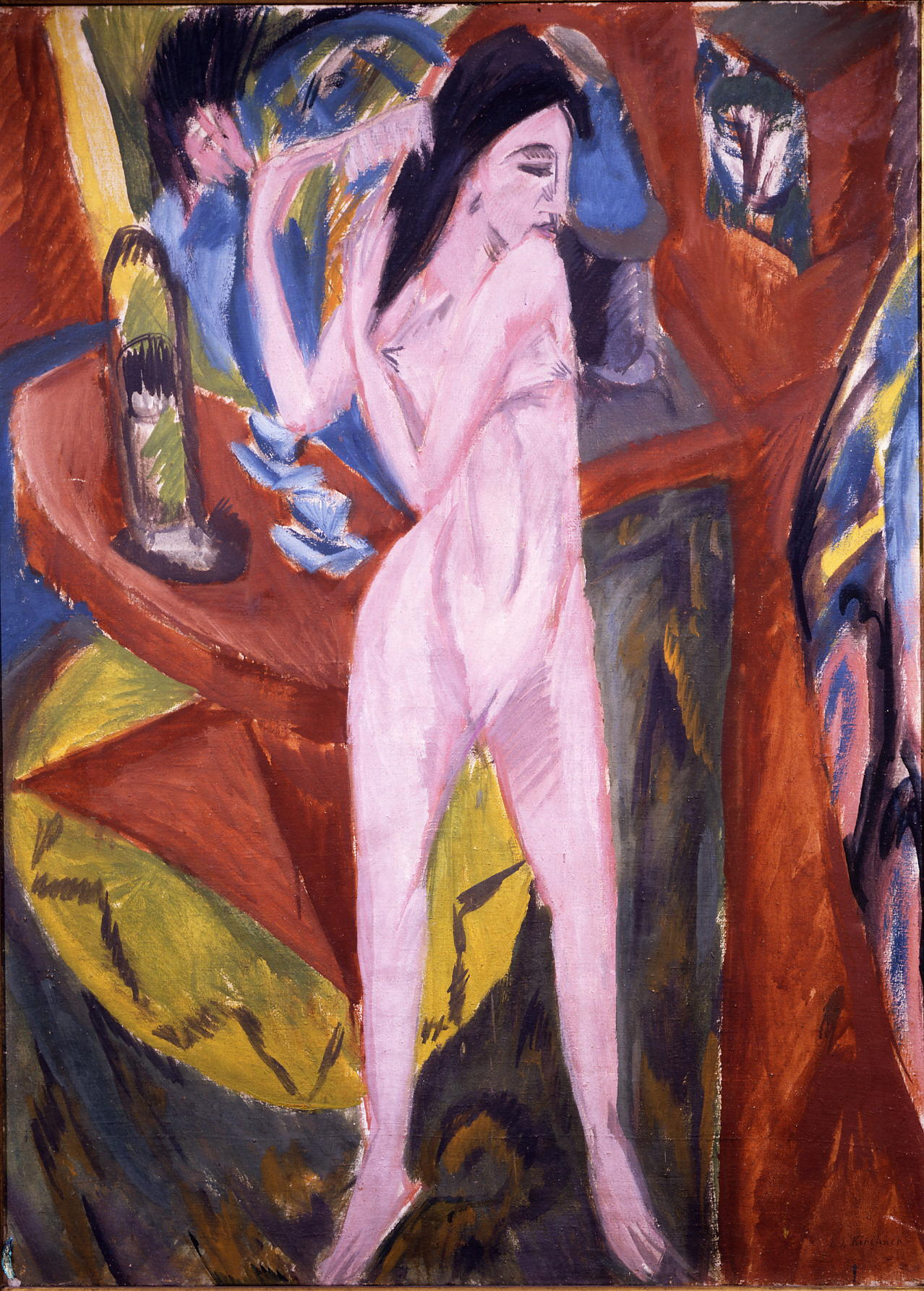
Ernst Ludwig Kirchner: Nude combing her hair (in German: Sich kämmender Akt, 1913)

Opened in 1967, it features around 400 paintings and sculptures and several thousand drawings, watercolours and prints by members of Die Brücke, the movement founded in 1905 in Dresden. The collection includes a donation from the painter Karl Schmidt-Rottluff to the state of Berlin, and a later donation from Erich Heckel featuring key works from the early years of the movement.

In 2006, Ernst Ludwig Kirchner's Berlin Street Scene (1913) that had been hanging in the Brücke Museum since 1980 was returned to the heirs of a Jewish family who owned it before World War II. In 2024, the museum reached a settlement with the heirs of Jewish art dealer Victor Wallerstein who was forced to sell Kirchner's Erich Heckel and Otto Mueller Playing Chess (1913), which eventually ended up in the museum’s collection, after he fled Nazi Germany. Also in 2024, the Brücke Museum returned Max Pechstein's drawing Two Female Dancers (1910) to the heirs of German economist Hans Heymann who had initially filed their claim in 2016.

== Exhibitions ==
In 2012, the Brücke Museum loaned a substantial part of its collection, with more than 120 paintings, drawings and woodcuts, to the Museum of Grenoble.

== Location ==
The museum is located in an idyllic natural setting in Dahlem, not far from the former studio of the sculptor Arno Breker. It conducts research into works by the founding members of the movement and their early 20th-century milieu and contemporaries. The museum presents both a continually changing selection of its own works, and frequent special exhibitions of works on loan.
