= Kirchnerhaus =

House museum in Aschanffenburg, Germany

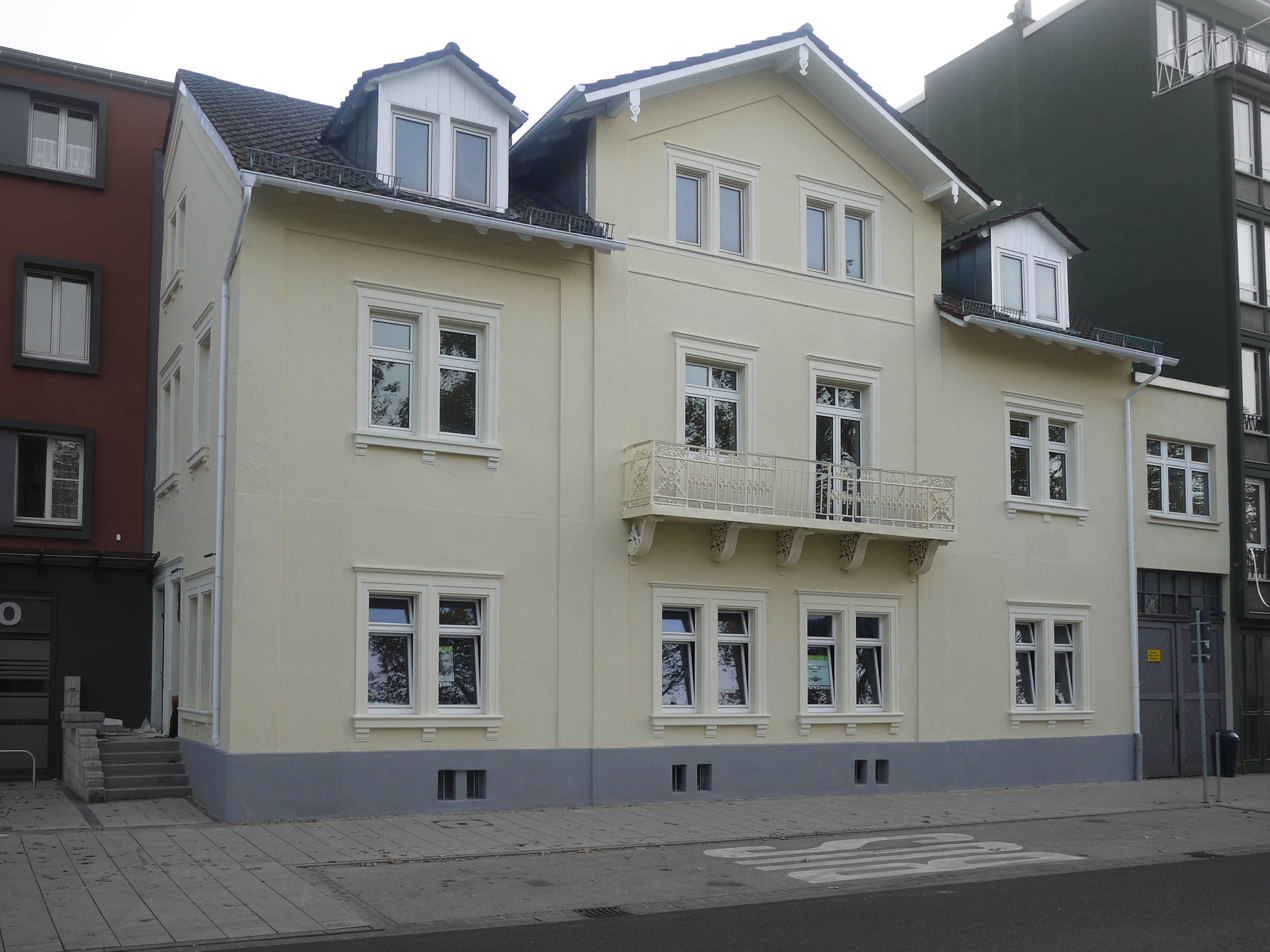
- The Kirchnerhaus in Aschaffenburg
- Interactive fullscreen map
- Location: Aschaffenburg, Germany
- Coordinates: 49°58′47″N 9°08′27″E

The Kirchnerhaus, also known as KirchnerHAUS Aschaffenburg eV (English: House Kirchner), is an historical house museum in Aschaffenburg, Bavaria, Germany, the birthplace of the German expressionist painter Ernst Ludwig Kirchner, at Ludwigstraße 19. In 2013, the KirchnerHAUS Aschaffenburg association set up a documentation room in the former apartment of the Kirchner family.

== History ==
Ernst Ludwig Kirchner was born on 6 May 1880 in this house south of the Bavarian-Prussian railway station in Aschaffenburg (today's Aschaffenburg Hauptbahnhof) and spent the first six years of his life there. The address at that time was Große Bahnhofsstraße 217 D. The family's place of residence had a major influence on Kirchner's early artistic development.

In 1930 Kirchner wrote in his Davos diary: “I was born next to the train station. The first thing I saw in life were the moving locomotives and trains, I drew them when I was three years old. Maybe it's because of this that observing the movement in particular stimulates me to create. It gives me the heightened awareness of life that is the origin of the artistic work.” The motif of the moving train can be seen, among other things, in Kirchner's painting Rheinbrücke in Cologne.

== The building ==
The Kirchnerhaus was built in 1862 at almost the same time as the opposite station building in the classical style. At the back of the house there was a large garden. A brick wall facing Bahnhofsstraße protected residents from the noise and smoke of passing trains. The house has a central projection and two dormer windows. On the first floor, where the Kirchners lived in a 160 square meter apartment, there is a balcony with iron brackets and railings. The attic has the form of a dominant transverse gable in the central avant-corps. The house survived almost undamaged in both world wars and is therefore in its original condition. Around 1950, a three-storey outbuilding was added, the extension was used as a car repair shop and gas station. On the occasion of Kirchner's 75th birthday on 6 May 1955, the Aschaffenburg History and Art Association had a commemorative plaque designed by the sculptor Otto Gentil attached to the facade of the house. The building, which is privately owned, was used for restaurants and then as an arcade until 1975. It was only set for sale in 2010. The city of Aschaffenburg did not use its right of first refusal. The new owner was very interested in the history of the house. In 2012 he had it renovated in line with the requirements of a monument. In the course of this renovation and after the arcade was moved into the neighboring building, the large shop windows on the front were removed.

== House museum ==
The KirchnerHAUS Aschaffenburg association, founded on 28 July 2011, opened a documentation center on Kirchner's childhood room, on the first floor, in 2013. At the beginning of 2014, the ground floor started being rented for exhibitions, lectures and events. Exhibitions have been held there regularly since 2015. In 2017, the exhibition venue in the birthplace of Ernst Ludwig Kirchner was given the status of a museum. The KirchnerHAUS eV received the Bavarian Homeland Prize. The city of Aschaffenburg now supports the KirchnerHAUS Museum and its sponsoring association financially and professionally. In 2016, a comprehensive bundle of literature on Ernst Ludwig Kirchner and the artists of Die Brücke was donated to the KirchnerHAUS eV. That was the cornerstone for the creation of a comprehensive reference library, which now includes around 1500 titles, including primary literature by the artists Ernst Ludwig Kirchner, Erich Heckel, Fritz Bleyl, Karl Schmidt-Rottluff, Otto Mueller, Emil Nolde and Max Pechstein, scientific literature as well as catalogs raisonnés, exhibition and sales catalogues, etc. The library is located in the so-called Kirchner room in the former apartment of the Kirchner family, on the first floor, and can be attended on pre-registration can be attended.

On the occasion of the 10th anniversary of the KirchnerHAUS Aschaffenburg eV, the bronze plaque by Otto Gentil, which had been saved during the restoration of the building, was reinstalled.
