= Max Kaus =

German painter

- Born: 11 March 1891; Berlin, Germany
- Died: 5 August 1977; Berlin, Germany
- Education: Unterrichtsanstalt des Kunstgewerbemuseums, Berlin; Akademie der Künste, Berlin
- Occupations: Expressionist painter Academy teacher Graphic artist & print maker
- Spouse(s): 1. Gertrud "Turu" Kant (1893-1944); 2. Brigitte Kamm; 3. Sigrid Reinke
- Parent(s): Joseph Kaus; Elmire Möhle

Max Kaus (11 March 1891 - 5 August 1977) was a German "second generation" expressionist painter and graphic artist. He was also influential as a university level teacher and as deputy director at the Academy for visual arts ("Hochschule für Bildende Künste" / HfbK) in the city at that time known as West Berlin.

== Life ==
=== Family provenance and early years ===
Max Kaus was born and, eighty-six years later, died in Berlin. Joseph Kaus, his father, is described as "a church painter". His early training was in decorative art: between 1908 and 1913 he attended the Study Institute of the Decorative Arts Museum ("Unterrichtsanstalt des Kunstgewerbemuseums" / UAKGM) in Berlin. He was powerfully influenced by the expressionism of the movement known as the Bridges Group ("Die Brücke"). His study was combined with work as a freelance decorative artist. That was followed by a shorter period, during 1913/14, as a student at the city's Arts Academy ("Akademie der Künste"). Impatient to build a career, he moved into his first studio in 1913. The award of a travel bursary early in 1914 enabled him to travel with his student-friend Mieczeslav Woitkiewicz to Paris, which aroused his interest in fine arts. Their stay was cut short by the outbreak of the First World War at the end of July, and he hastily returned to Berlin.

=== War years ===
In 1916 he reported for military service, enrolling as a "medical orderly" and as an ambulance driver. He was one of a number of artists who served as medical orderlies, based in Ostend and undertaking their duties in western Flanders. A leading member of the group, in artistic terms, was Erich Heckel. Sources differ as to whether Heckel and Kaus already knew one another during the pre-war years, but it is clear that Heckel, with whom he remained in close contact after 1918, was an important influence, both in artistic and in human terms. Together in Ostend during the war, using what must have been in some respects improvised equipment, Heckel taught Kaus how to make lithograph prints. They constructed their printing press using timber recovered from panelling previously forming a part of a destroyed railway station building. They acquired two printing stones from a Belgian lithograph printer. Once Kaus as able to return to Berlin in 1918 he purchased his own lithography equipment, which provided a basis for an important part of his subsequent artistic output. Other important members of the Bridges Group with whom Kaus was associated during the war years included Ernst Ludwig Kirchner and Karl Schmidt-Rottluff.

=== Career progression ===
Kaus had his first solo exhibition in 1919, at the Ferdinand Möller gallery. The next year he met up with Otto Mueller and Karl Schmidt-Rottluff at the modernist so-called "Freie Sezession", and became a member of the group, his work regularly featuring in subsequent "Freie Sezession" exhibitions. In 1923 he married the porcelain artist Gertrud Kant (1893-1944). In 1926 Kaus accepted a professorship, teaching landscape art at the Kunstgewerbe- und Handwerkerschule (loosely, "Arts and Crafts academy") in Berlin. It was for his landscape works that he was (and remains) principally recognised. He drew inspiration from his travels within Germany and in the recently reconfigured state of Austria, as well as in northern Italy. Earlier he had worked extensively on portraiture. During the immediate post-war period Kaus produced a number of portraits of haggard, somehow bizarrely lost young men, which showed every sign of drawing inspiration from the works produced ten years earlier by Heckel and, above all Kirchner. Unfortunately this vision of German Expressionism in art was no longer so fashionable, however.

=== Hitler years ===
Early in 1933 the Hitler government took power and lost no time in transforming Germany into a one-party dictatorship. When it came to art the National Socialists knew what they liked. Max Kaus was one of a large number of modernist artists, including his longstanding mentor Heckel, who had enjoyed commercial and critical success in the 1920s, and who now found their work officially (and more widely) dismissed and despised as "degenerate". In 1937 his works were formally "removed from public view" in museums and galleries.

Meanwhile, in 1935 or 1937 he took a job teaching "figurative art" with the Unified National Academies for Free and Applied Art ("Vereinigte Staatsschulen [für freie und angewandte Kunst]" / VS), a traditionally progressive institution in Berlin-Charlottenburg. However, he found himself under intensifying pressure to abandon teaching entirely as the dictatorship became more uncompromising in its approach to manifestations of non-standard thought patterns. Sources differ as to whether it was in 1938 or 1939 that he was obliged to give up his teaching position at the VS (which was itself closed down during 1939).

=== Tragedies ===
The Hitler years delivered other personal disasters and tragedies to Max Kaus who during the early 1940s continued to live in central Berlin at an address in the Mommsenstraße. There was little scope for landscape paintings and he reverted to portraiture, his favourite subject being now his wife, known as "Turu". Portraits survive of Turu awake and of Turu asleep, sometimes contorted into positions that must have been desperately uncomfortable, and wearing a wide array of outfits: commentators infer profound love and affection from these paintings. Max Klaus' home was also his studio. During 1943 the house was destroyed by fire as a result of bombing from the air. 200 paintings were destroyed. Kaus nevertheless managed to save some of his early graphic prints which were smaller and more transportable where urgency was of the essence.

Following the destruction by fire of his home and studio in Charlottenburg during 1943, Kaus moved to Pfaueninsel ("Peacock Island"), an island retreat along the Havel River in the southwest of the city. Later, two days before the "end of the war", the island came under attack from the Soviet military and many of the graphic prints carefully salvaged from the earlier fire were destroyed.

Turu, his wife, died in January 1944 after an intensely painful period suffering from cancer. Later that same year Max Kaus married his second wife, the art student Brigitte Kamm. This marriage ended in divorce in 1948.

=== Post-war years ===
After 1945, with much of his previous work destroyed in the fighting, the focus of Kaus' career switched more firmly towards teaching the next generation. As regards his own output, in the words of one commentator, "his work [became] less expressive, with form [now] dominating content". On 15 July 1945 he started a new job at Berlin's "Hochschule für Bildende Künste" (HfbK / "Visual Arts Academy" subsequently merged into the city's "University of the Arts") where he served as deputy director under the leadership of Karl Hofer. He subsequently, in 1949, gained a full professorship at the academy and then took charge of the department for "Freie Kunst" (loosely, "free, or non-applied arts").

=== Golden years ===
In 1953 Max Kaus married the dancer Sigrid Reinke. They met because Reinke was funding her studies at the Mary Wigman [dance] Academy by working as a life-model at the HfbK. Their first meeting alone together started, primly enough, with a cup of tea. Despite the forty year age difference and one or two other unusual elements in their situation, Sigrid Kraus later recalled that her mother surprised her by unreservedly endorsing the marriage, evidently believing that the two were "right" for each other. They lived together, till 1958, at Max Kaus' apartment in the so-called "artists' colony" in Berlin-Wilmersdorf.

A commentator subdivides the post-war artistic output of Kaus into four categories: there are his "North Sea paintings" and his "Rome paintings", there are the "Venetian impressionist works" of the early 1960s and then there are, fourthly, the portraits and still lifes from the final part of his creative years.

In 1959 Max Kaus retired from his position at the academy. In 1958 Max and Sigrid Kaus had relocated from the Wilmersdorf "artists' colony" to Potsdamer Straße 44 in Berlin-Lichterfelde where they lived together for almost twenty years. They travelled together extensively. Many years later the widowed Sigrid Kaus told an interviewer that these were "beautiful, rich and exciting years". (Note: "Es waren schöne, reiche und spannende Jahre.") Max Kaus died in Berlin on 5 August 1977. Sigrid Kaus was still living at the home they had shared twenty years after her husband's death. The forty year difference in their ages had always made this a likely outcome: after the death of Max Kaus his widow was able to facilitate exhibitions and other projects involving his work. She has also ensured that his surviving works are properly catalogued and indexed. Since 1987 his literary estate has been held at the German National Arts Archive (Deutsches Kunstarchiv) in the Germanisches Nationalmuseum at Nuremberg.

== Memberships ==
Max Kaus became a member of the German Artists' Association ("Deutscher Künstlerbund"/ DKB) and remained a member until 1936 when the association was forcibly suppressed by then government. The physical event marking the suppression was the DKB's final exhibition (till after 1945) which was held in Hamburg, and at which Kaus participated with his "Porträt Frau im Spiegel" ("Portrait of a woman in the mirror"). Between 1951 and 1971 he served as a member of the executive board of the now re-established DKB, serving also as deputy chair between 1956 and 1963.

== Awards and honours (selection) ==
- 1928: Günter Wagner Prize from the Hanover Arts Association ("Kunstverein")
- 1963: Berlin Art Prize
