= Fritz Bleyl =

German artist

- Born: Fritz Bleyl; 8 October 1880; Zwickau, German Empire
- Died: 19 August 1966 (aged 85); Bad Iburg, West Germany

Hilmar Friedrich Wilhelm Bleyl, known as Fritz Bleyl (8 October 1880 – 19 August 1966), was a German artist of the Expressionist school, and one of the four founders of artist group Die Brücke ("The Bridge"). He designed graphics for the group including, for their first show, a poster, which was banned by the police. He left the group after only two years, when he married, to look after his family, and did not exhibit publicly thereafter.

== Life and work ==
Fritz Bleyl was born in Zwickau, Kingdom of Saxony, and grew up in the Erzgebirge region. In 1901 he began studying architecture at the Königliche Technische Hochschule (technical university) of Dresden, as his parents wished; however, his own desire was to become a painter. The institution provided a wide range of studies in addition to architecture, such as freehand drawing, perspective drawing and the historical study of art.

Bleyl became close friends with fellow student, Ernst Ludwig Kirchner, whom he met during the first term. They discussed art together and also studied nature, having a radical outlook in common.

In 1905, Bleyl along with Ernst Ludwig Kirchner, and two other architecture students, Karl Schmidt-Rottluff and Erich Heckel, founded the artists group Die Brücke ("The Bridge"). The group aimed to eschew the prevalent traditional academic style and find a new mode of artistic expression, which would form a bridge (hence the name) between the past and the present. They responded both to past artists such as Albrecht Dürer, Matthias Grünewald and Lucas Cranach the Elder, as well as contemporary international avant-garde movements. Their group was one of the seminal ones, which in due course had a major impact on the evolution of modern art in the 20th century and created the style of Expressionism. At this time, Bleyl was a keen member of the group. This met initially in Kirchner's first studio, which had previously been a butcher's shop. Bleyl described it as:

that of a real bohemian, full of paintings lying all over the place, drawings, books and artist's materials — much more like an artist's romantic lodgings than the home of a well-organised architecture student.

Kirchner's studio lived up to Bleyl's description, becoming a venue which overthrew social conventions to allow casual love-making and frequent nudity. Group life-drawing sessions took place using models from the social circle, rather than professionals, and choosing quarter-hour poses to encourage spontaneity. Bleyl described one such model, Isabella, a fifteen-year-old girl from the neighbourhood, as "a very lively, beautifully built, joyous individual, without any deformation caused by the silly fashion of the corset and completely suitable to our artistic demands, especially in the blossoming condition of her girlish buds."

The group composed a manifesto (mostly Kirchner's work), which was carved on wood and asserted a new generation, "who want freedom in our work and in our lives, independence from older, established forces."

As part of the affirmation of their national heritage, they revived older media, particularly woodcut prints. Bleyl specialised in graphic design and created several significant posters and tickets presenting the group to the general public.

In September and October 1906, the first group exhibition was held, focused on the female nude, in the showroom of K.F.M. Seifert and Co. in Dresden. Deriving from the life studies, Bleyl created a lithographic poster for the show printed in orange ink on white paper. It has a narrow, portrait format, more akin to Japanese woodcuts than conventional contemporary prints, and was a distinct contrast to the poster designed by Otto Gussmann for the Third German Exhibition of Applied Arts, which had opened four months previously in Dresden. Bleyl omits iconography such as a crown, a lamp and a flowing gown, to show a bold nude of the model Isabella full-length above the lettering. Police censors barred the display of the poster under Paragraph 184, the National Penal Code pornography clause, after perceiving pubic hair in the shadow underneath the stomach.

In 1905, Bleyl completed his university studies and, the following year, began to teach at the Bauschule (school of architecture) in Freiberg, Saxony. He chose a bourgeois lifestyle, marrying in 1907 and, with a concern to support his family, left the group. He was replaced by Max Pechstein and Otto Mueller.

In 1916, he completed his dissertation in Dresden under Cornelius Gustav Gurlitt, and travelled in Italy and through the Alps. For the rest of his life, he continued to teach and to practise as an architect. He also continued with graphic work, but kept out of public gaze and did not have exhibitions. After the World War II his apartment was confiscated in 1945 following which he settled in Zwickau with his brother until 1948. He resided in Rostock, Neukölln in Berlin, and Brandenburg. In 1959 he moved to Lugano in Switzerland. He died in Bad Iburg, aged 85.

== Exhibitions ==
Fritz Bleyl exhibited in the following Die Brücke shows. Die Brücke organised touring exhibitions, where the same work would be shown again in a different venue.

- I Print Collection, Kunsthalle Beyer & Sohn gallery, Leipzig, November 1905
- July 1906, August Dörbant Art Salon, Braunschweig
- I Print Collection 1906–1907, Georg Hulbe Kunstgewerbehaus, Hamburg, September 1906
- Seifert Lamp Factory, Dresden-Löbtau, 24 September – end October 1906
- I Print Collection 1906–1907, Katharinenhof gallery, Frankfurt am Main, November 1906
- II Print Collection 1906–19076, Städtische Vorbildersammlung, Chemnitz, December 190
- Seifert Lamp Factory, Dresden-Löbtau, 3 December – end January 1907
- I Print Collection 1906–1907, Friedrich Cohen Art Salon, Bonn, February 1907
- II Print Collection 1906–1907, Zwickau Kunstverein, Zwickau, January – February 1907
- I Print Collection 1906–1907, Wilhelm Werner Art Salon, Göttingen, March – April 1907
- II Print Collection 1906–1907, Otto Fischer Art Salon, Bielefeld, March 1905
- II Print Collection 1906–1907, Düsseldorf Städtische Kunsthalle, Düsseldorf, April 1907
- I Print Collection 1906–1907, Leopold-Hoesch-Museum, Düren, June 1907
- II Print Collection 1906–1907, Heidelberg Kunstverein, Heidelberg, June 1907
- II Painting and Print Exhibition, Flensburg Gewerbemuseum, Flensburg, June 1907
- II Print Collection 1906–1907, Würrtemberg Kunstverein, Stuttgart, July 1907
- I Print Collection 1906–1907, Pfälzischer Kunstverein, Speyer, August 1907
- II Painting and Print Exhibition, Clematis Art Salon, Hamburg, July – August 1907
- II Painting and Print Exhibition, Emil Richter Art Salon, Dresden, September 1907
- I Print Collection 1906–1907, XV Kunstverein Exhibition, Rosenheim, October 1907
- II Painting and Print Exhibition, Kaiser Wilhelm Museum, Magdeburg, October 1907

== See also ==
- List of German painters
