= Robert Graetz (art collector) =

Robert Graetz (October 5, 1878 – December 31, 1945), was a German Jewish textile industrialist and art collector in Berlin who was deported by the Nazis and died at Auschwitz.

== Early life and family ==
Born in Berlin on October 5, 1878, into a German Jewish family, Graetz's brother, Hugo, was an art dealer.

Graetz married Bluma Shifra (April 28, 1934-April 18.1940) and had a daughter, Hilda Graetz (Ruschkewitz)

== Entrepreneur ==
Graetz's business, Firma für Damenmäntel Glass & Graetz, specialised in women's coats and suits.

== Art collection ==
Graetz built a collection of around 200 works by artists including Otto Dix, Emil Nolde, Karl Schmidt-Rottluff and Käthe Kollwitz.

== Death at Auschwitz ==
He remained in Berlin after his two children fled. His company, villa, and art collection were confiscated and he was deported to a Nazi concentration camp in 1942. He died at Auschwitz.

== Claims for restitution ==
Most of the artworks from Graetz's collection have not been recovered and are listed on the German Lost Art Foundation website. In 2011 the German Advisory Commission considered a claim for two paintings by Karl Schmidt-Rottluff at Berlin's Neue Nationalgalerie. 2019, the German Lost Art Foundation offered funding to help research the missing works. In 2021 the German Advisory Commission rejected a claim for a painting by Lovis Corith. In 2023, Christie's brokered a settlement for Max Pechstein's Still Life With a Cup, which Graetz's daughter Hilda sold as a refugee in South Africa. Pechstein's granddaughter provided sales records to help identify the painting In December 2023, the family filed a claim against the Hamburger Kunsthalle for the restitution of Paula Modersohn-Becker: Girl's Head which the widow of Nazi art dealer Konrad Doebbeke had donated to the museum.
