= Theo von Brockhusen =

German painter and engraver (1882–1919)

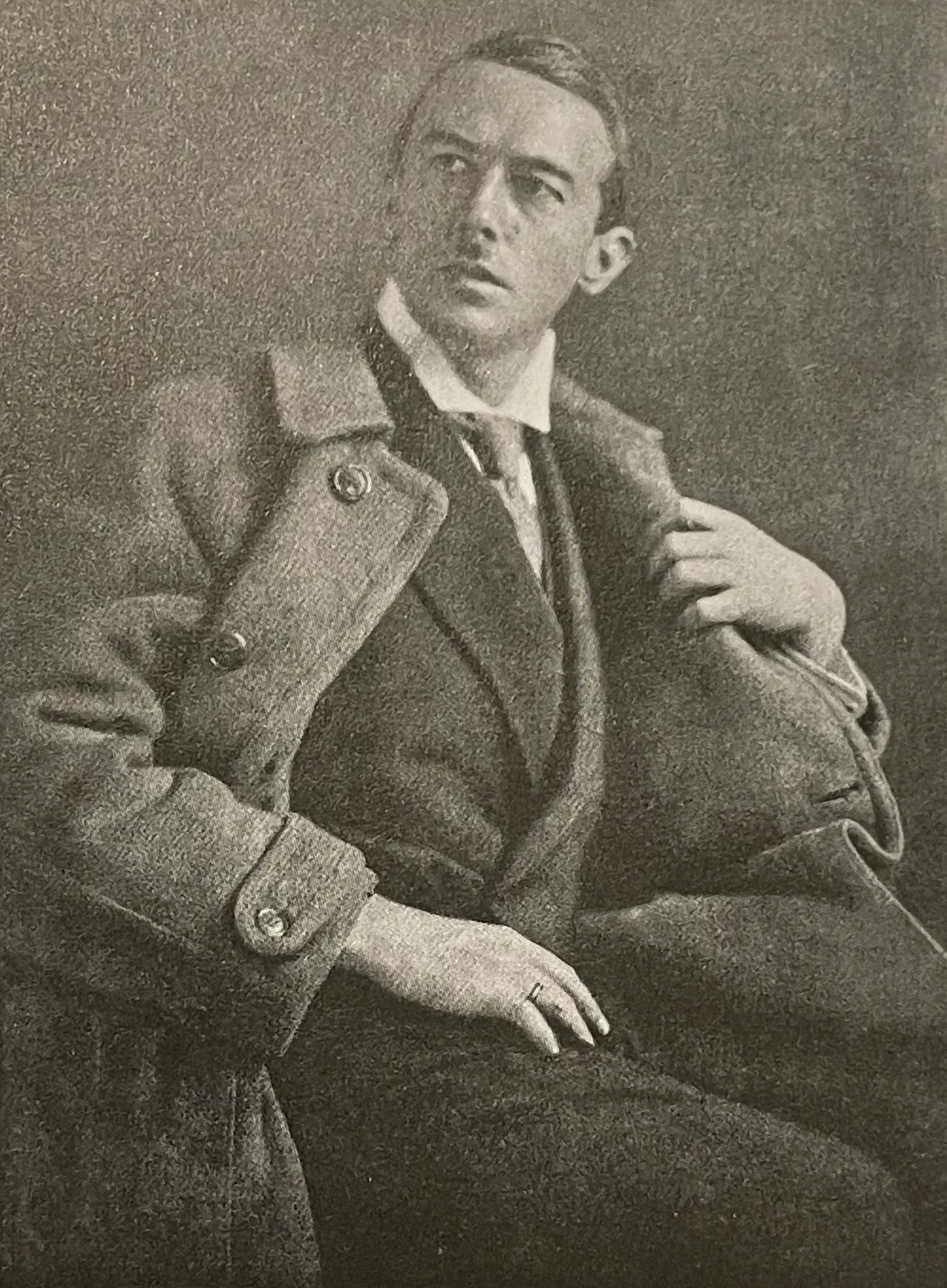
Theo von Brockhusen (undated photograph)

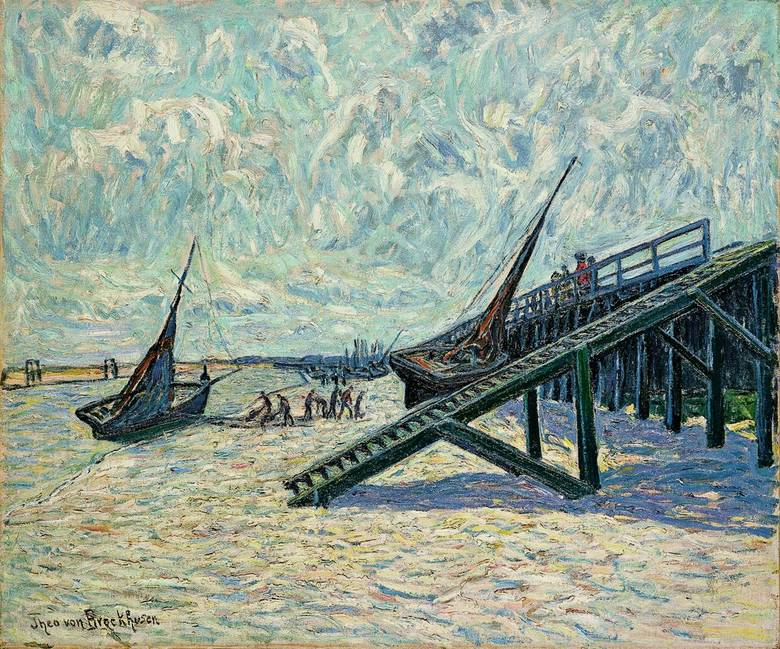
Beach Scene at Nieuwpoort

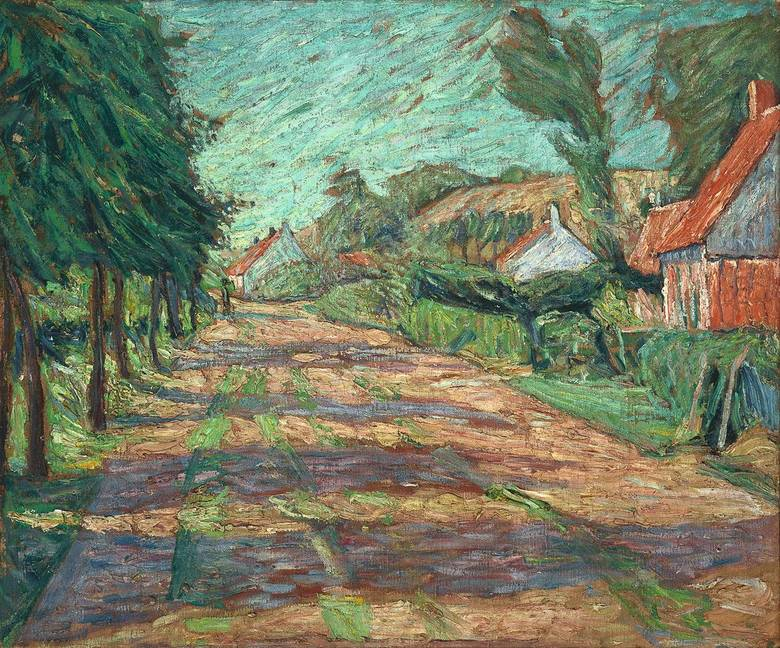
Village Street in the Sunlight

Theodor Adolf Hillmann von Brockhusen (16 July 1882, Marggrabowa – 20 April 1919, Berlin) was a German painter, graphic artist, and etcher. Most of his works are landscapes.

== Life and work ==
From 1898 to 1903, he studied with Max Schmidt, Ludwig Dettmann and Olof Jernberg, at the Kunstakademie Königsberg. Under Dettman's influence, his early landscapes were all painted en plein aire. After graduating, he moved to Berlin, where he joined the Berlin Secession in 1906. He exhibited with them, and served on their board, until 1913. During that time, he also developed a relationship with the art dealer, Paul Cassirer, who was his exclusive agent until 1915, and provided most of his income.

He made several study trips, to Paris, London, and the Belgian seaside resort of Knokke-Heist. In 1909, he paid a lengthy visit to Nieuwpoort. Under the influence of Max Liebermann, he created numerous scenes of sand dunes and beachgoers in an Impressionistic style. He also spent the summer months at the Schwielowsee, creating landscapes that expressed the changing colors from dawn to dusk.

In 1909, he married Hildegart Bothe, whom he had met in Paris. In the following years, he developed an interest in the works of Van Gogh and brightened his palette. In 1912, he won the Villa Romana Prize, which enabled him to spend six months in Florence in 1913. While there, he created landscapes with religious themes.

After returning to Berlin, he became one of the founding members of the Free Secession, serving as chairman of the board from 1918 to 1919. During the war, he was also a member of the "Klein-Kurener Kreis" at the Künstlerkolonie Nidden (artists' colony), in what is now Lithuania. In addition to Brockhusen, the group included Waldemar Rösler, Artur Degner, Alfred Partikel, and Franz Domscheit.

He died at his home in the Charlottenburg district of Berlin, aged only thirty-six, and was interred at the Evangelischer Kirchhof Nikolassee. His tomb features a statue by the sculptor, Fritz Klimsch. His works may be seen at the Stiftung Stadtmuseum Berlin, the Sprengel Museum in Hannover, the Kunsthalle Kiel, and the Kunstforum Ostdeutsche Galerie in Regensburg.

== Sources ==
- (in German) Theo von Brockhusen. In: Allgemeines Künstlerlexikon. Die Bildenden Künstler aller Zeiten und Völker (AKL). Band 14, Saur, München u. a. 1996, ISBN 3-598-22754-X, S. 301
- Max Osborn, "Brockhusen, Theo von", In: Allgemeines Lexikon der Bildenden Künstler von der Antike bis zur Gegenwart, Vol. 5: Brewer–Carlingen, E. A. Seemann, Leipzig 1911 (Online)
- Hans F. Schweers: Gemälde in deutschen Museen : Katalog d. ausgestellten und depotgelagerten Werke. Vol.1, Saur, 1994, ISBN 3-598-11061-8
- Irmgard Wirth: Berlin und die Mark Brandenburg – Landschaften. Christians, Hamburg 1982, ISBN 3-7672-0684-6
- Gerhard Leistner: Theo von Brockhusen: (1882–1919); ein Maler zwischen Impressionismus und Expressionismus, exhibition catalog, Stiftung Ostdeutsche Galerie, Regensburg 1999, ISBN 3-89188-088-X
