= Otto Mueller =

German artist (1874–1930)

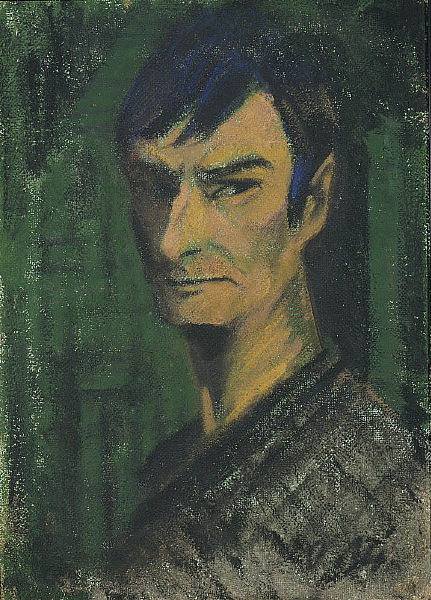
- Otto Müller, Self-Portrait, c. 1921, Saint Louis Art Museum
- Born: 16 October 1874; Liebau, German Empire
- Died: 25 September 1930 (aged 55); Breslau, Germany
- Education: Academy of Fine Arts, Dresden, Academy of Fine Arts, Munich
- Known for: Painting, printmaking
- Style: Expressionism
- Movement: Die Brücke

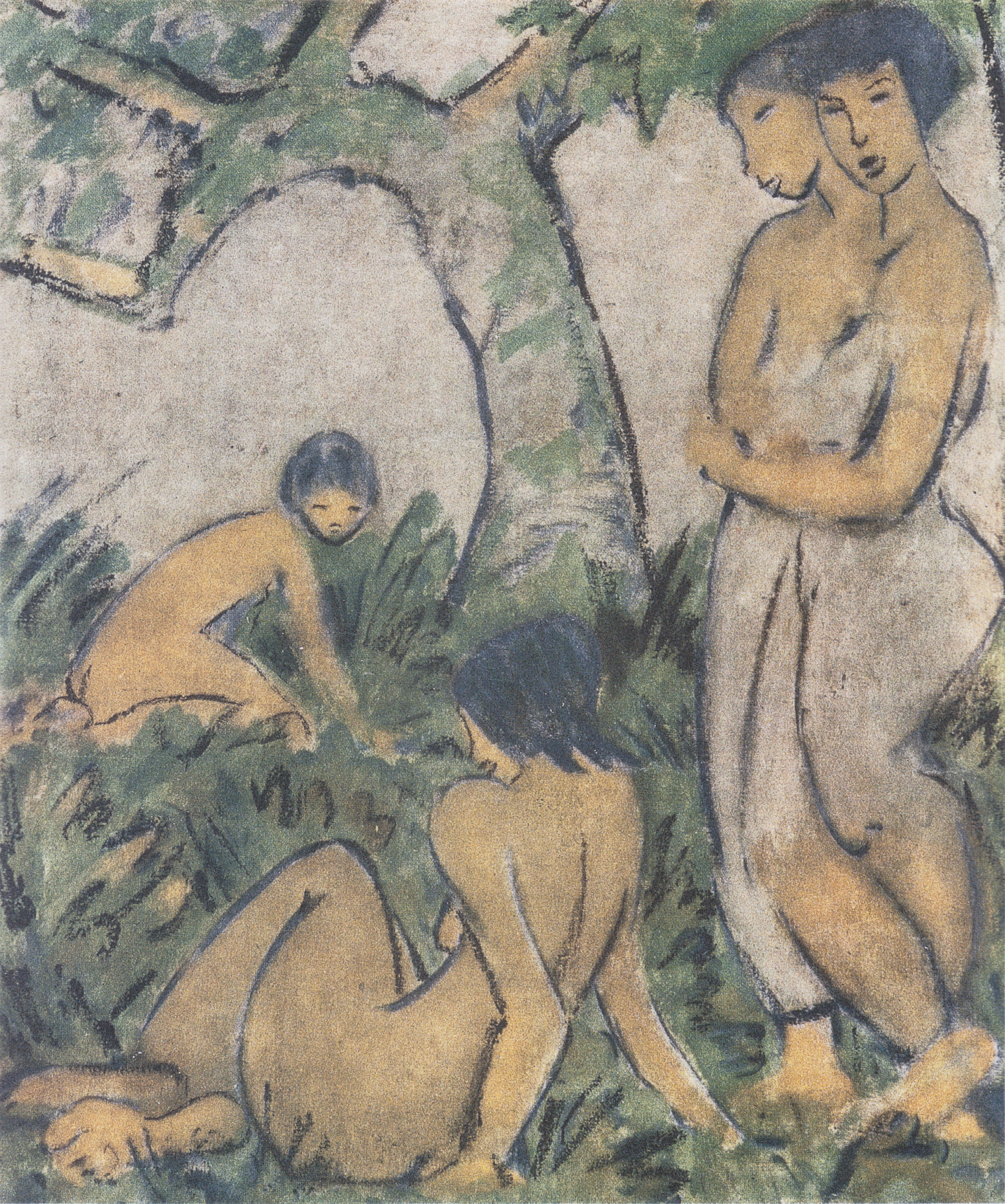
Otto Melller, Bathers (Badende), 1911, glue paint on plucking, 105 x 90 cm, private collection

Otto Mueller (16 October 1874 – 24 September 1930) was a German painter and printmaker of the Die Brücke expressionist movement.

== Life and work ==
Mueller was born in Liebau (now Lubawka, Kamienna Góra County), Kreis Landeshut, Silesia. Between 1890 and 1892 he was trained in lithography in Görlitz and Breslau. From 1894 to 1896 he studied at the Academy of Fine Arts in Dresden under Georg Freyer and continued his study in Munich during 1898. He left Munich's academy after Franz von Stuck classified him as untalented.

His early works are influenced by impressionism, Jugendstil and Symbolism. However, much of his early work is lost due to his own destruction of his early pieces. When he settled to Berlin in 1908, his style became more expressionist. In 1910, he joined 'Die Brücke', a Dresden-based group of Expressionist artists, and in 1911 worked and traveled with Ernst Ludwig Kirchner, Max Pechstein, and Erich Heckel. He continued his close association with Kirchner and Heckel after Brücke disbanded in 1913. At the same time Mueller also had contact with the artists group 'Der Blaue Reiter'. Mueller was known as vehemently antibourgeois and is said to have urinated on the floor of a middle-class household when he was invited for a dinner party.

During World War I he fought as a German soldier in France and Russia. After the war he became a professor at the Academy of Arts (Akademie der Bildenden Kunste) in Breslau where he taught until his death on 24 September 1930. Johnny Friedlaender and Isidor Ascheim were among his pupils there.

In 1937 the Nazis seized 357 of his works from German museums as "degenerate art". They also looted Mueller's artworks from Jewish collectors like the Littmanns. Other Muellers were lost or stolen during the war Several artworks by Mueller turned up in the Gurlitt hoard.

Mueller was one of the most lyrical of German expressionist painters. The main topic of Mueller's works is the unity of humans and nature; his paintings emphasize a harmonious simplification of form, colour and contours. He is known especially for his characteristic paintings of nudes and Romani women; his nickname was "Gypsy Mueller" and his mother was perhaps Romani. Mueller greatly admired Egyptian art, and likened his use of simple clean lines to the ancient style. The medium he preferred for his paintings was distemper on coarse canvas, which produced a mat surface. Altogether his printmaking amounted to 172 prints, nearly all of them lithographs, but including a few woodcuts and etchings.

== Works ==
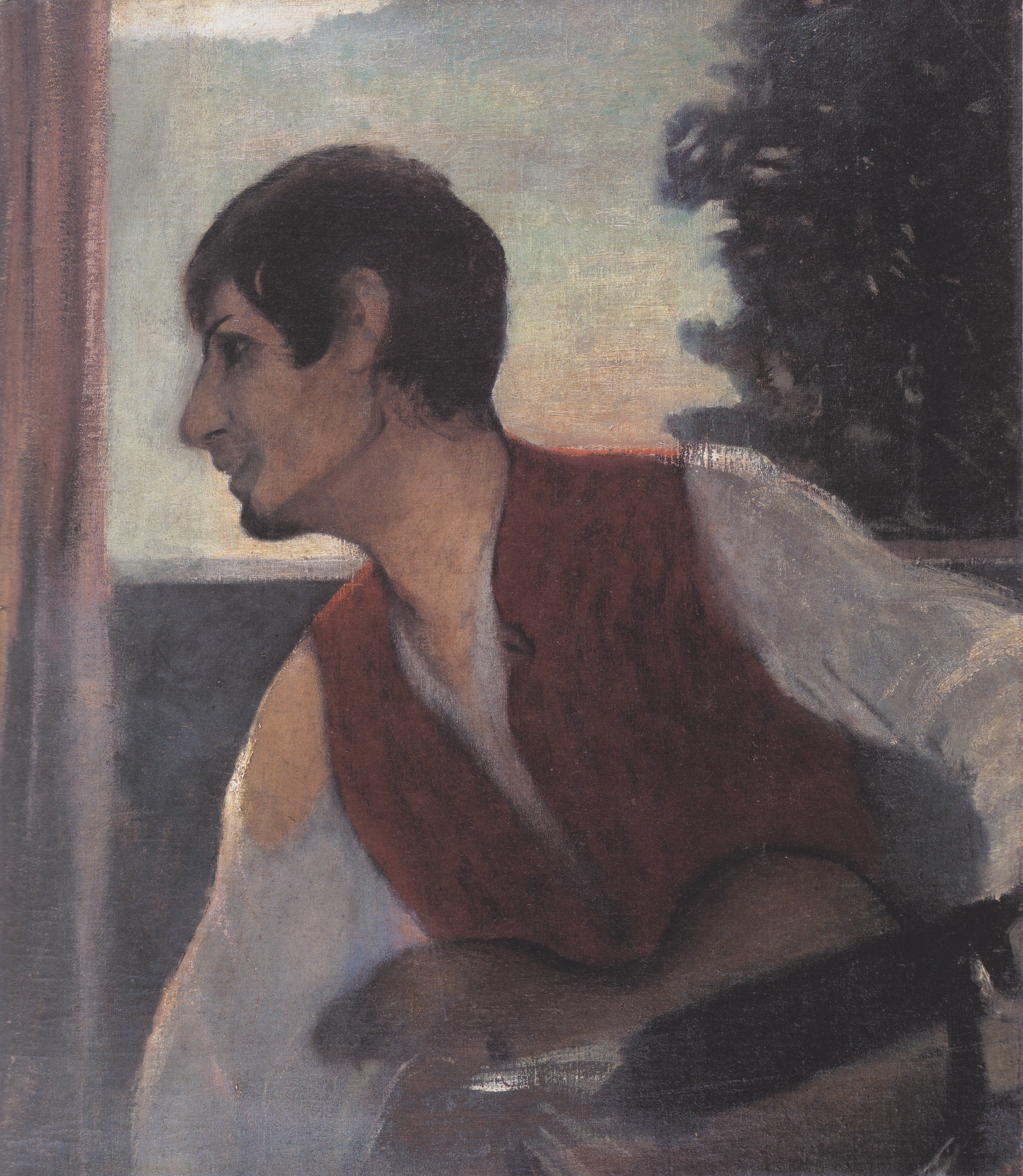
Self-portrait with guitar, 1903–04, oil on canvas, 76 × 65 cm, private collection

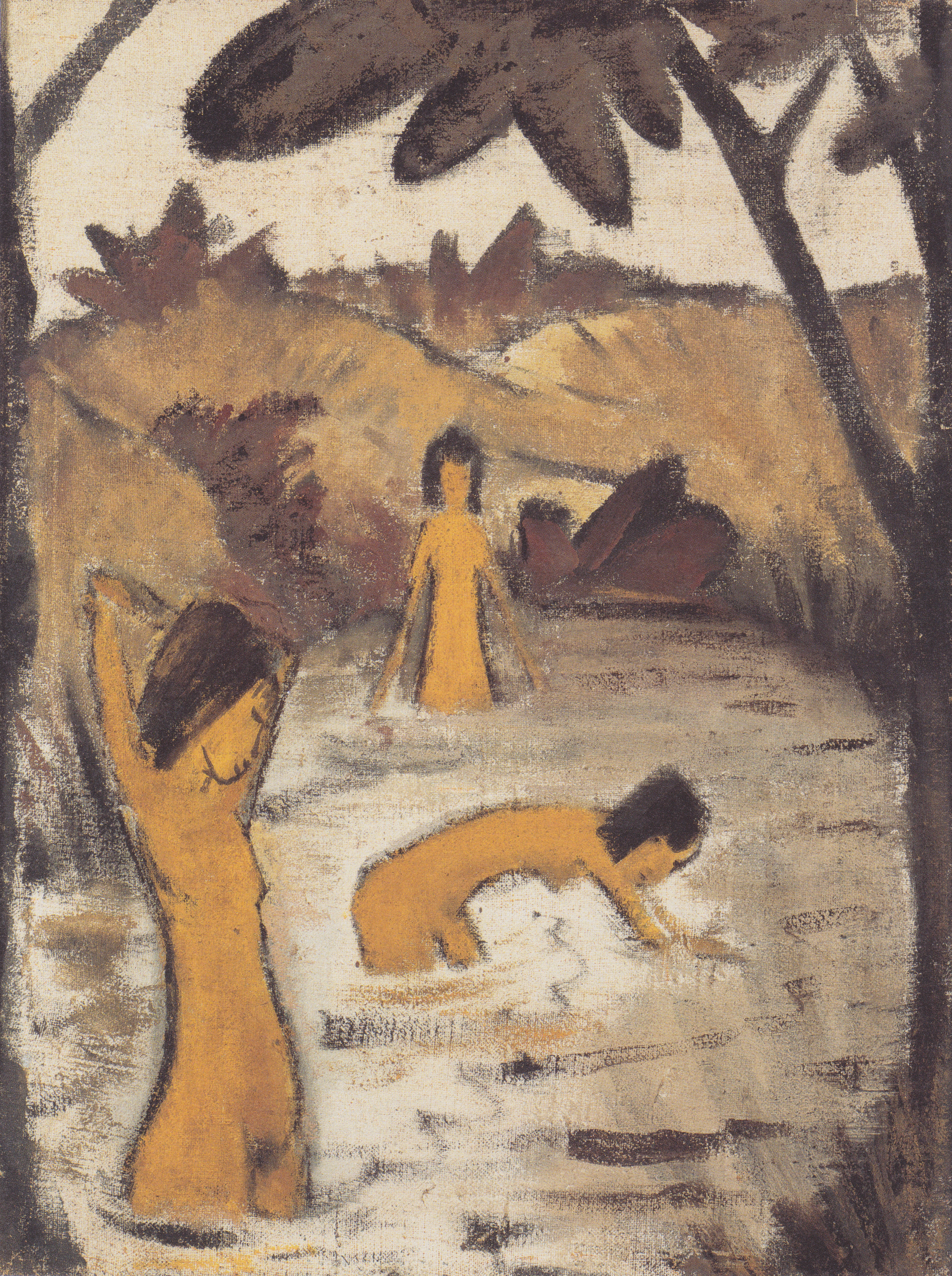
Three bathing women in the pond, c. 1912, glue paint on plucking, 119 x 90 cm, Museum am Ostwall, Dortmund

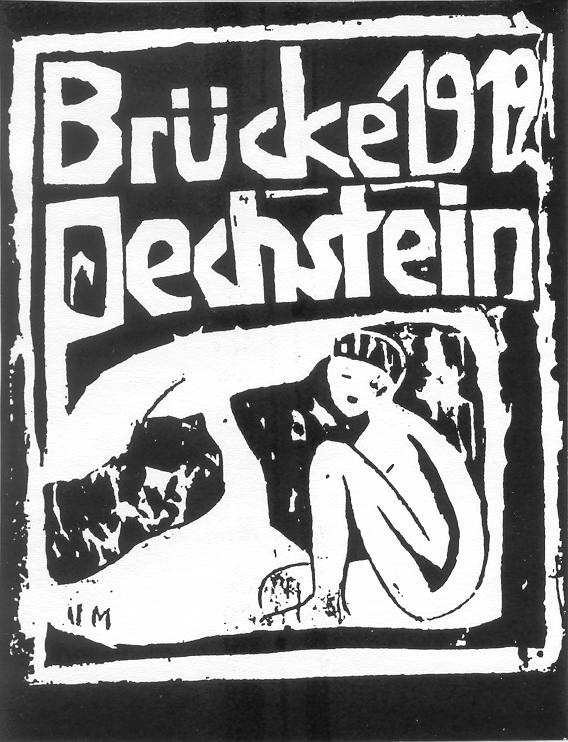
Brücke, 1912, wood-print on paper, on cover

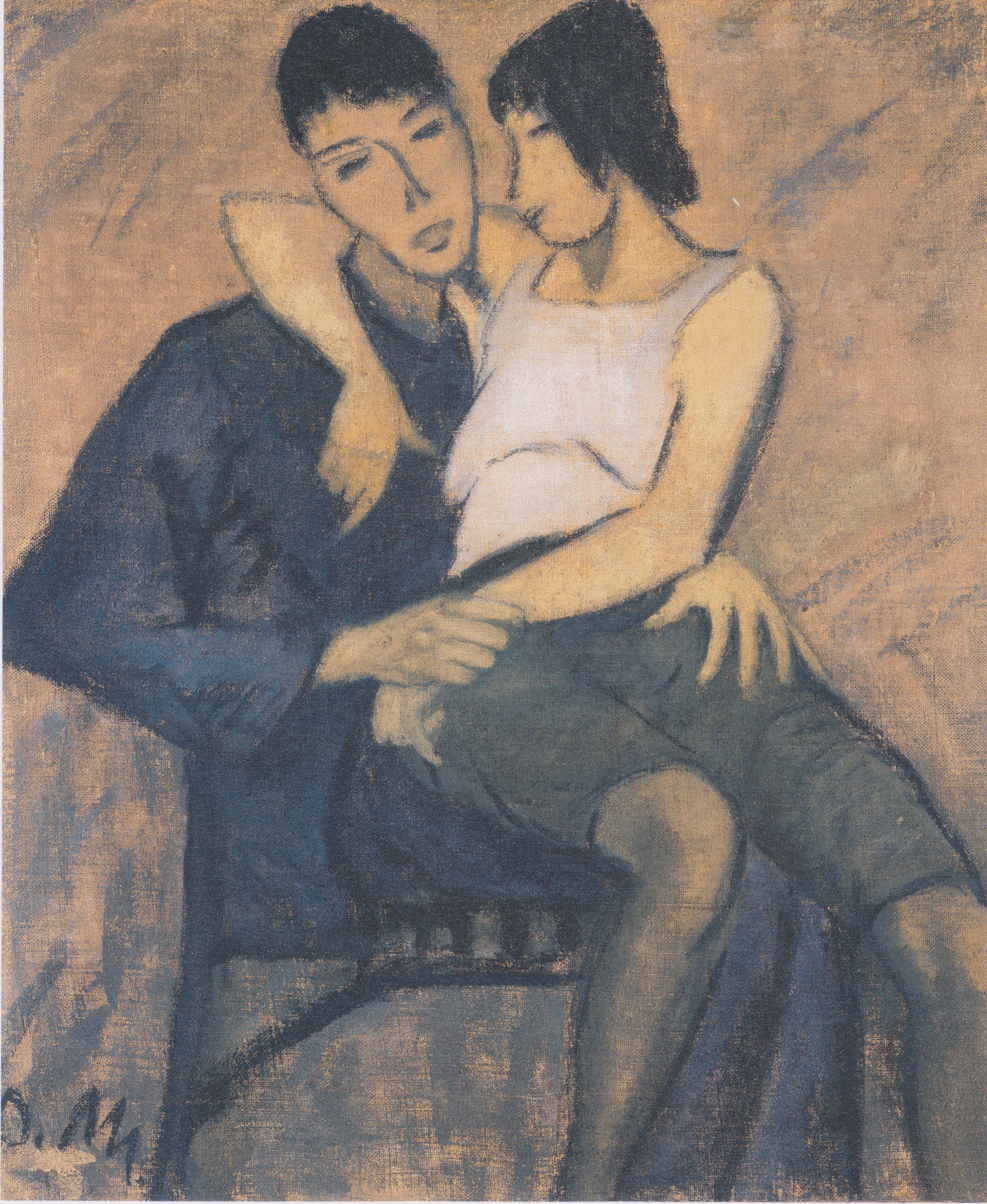
Two Lovers (Liebespaar), c. 1914, glue paint on plucking, 101.5 x 83.5 cm, private collection

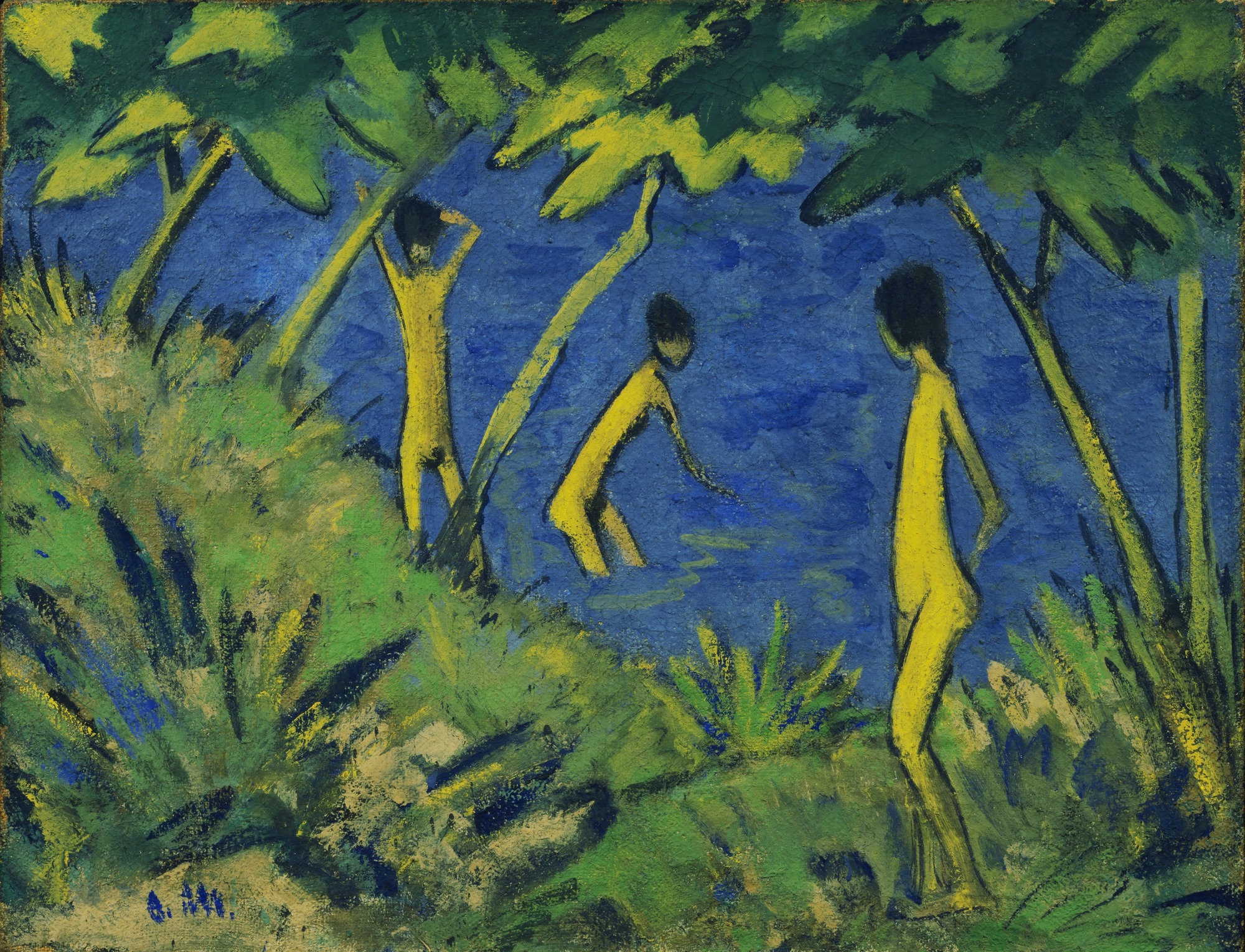
Landscape with Yellow Nudes, c. 1919, oil on burlap, 70.2 x 90.8 cm, MoMA

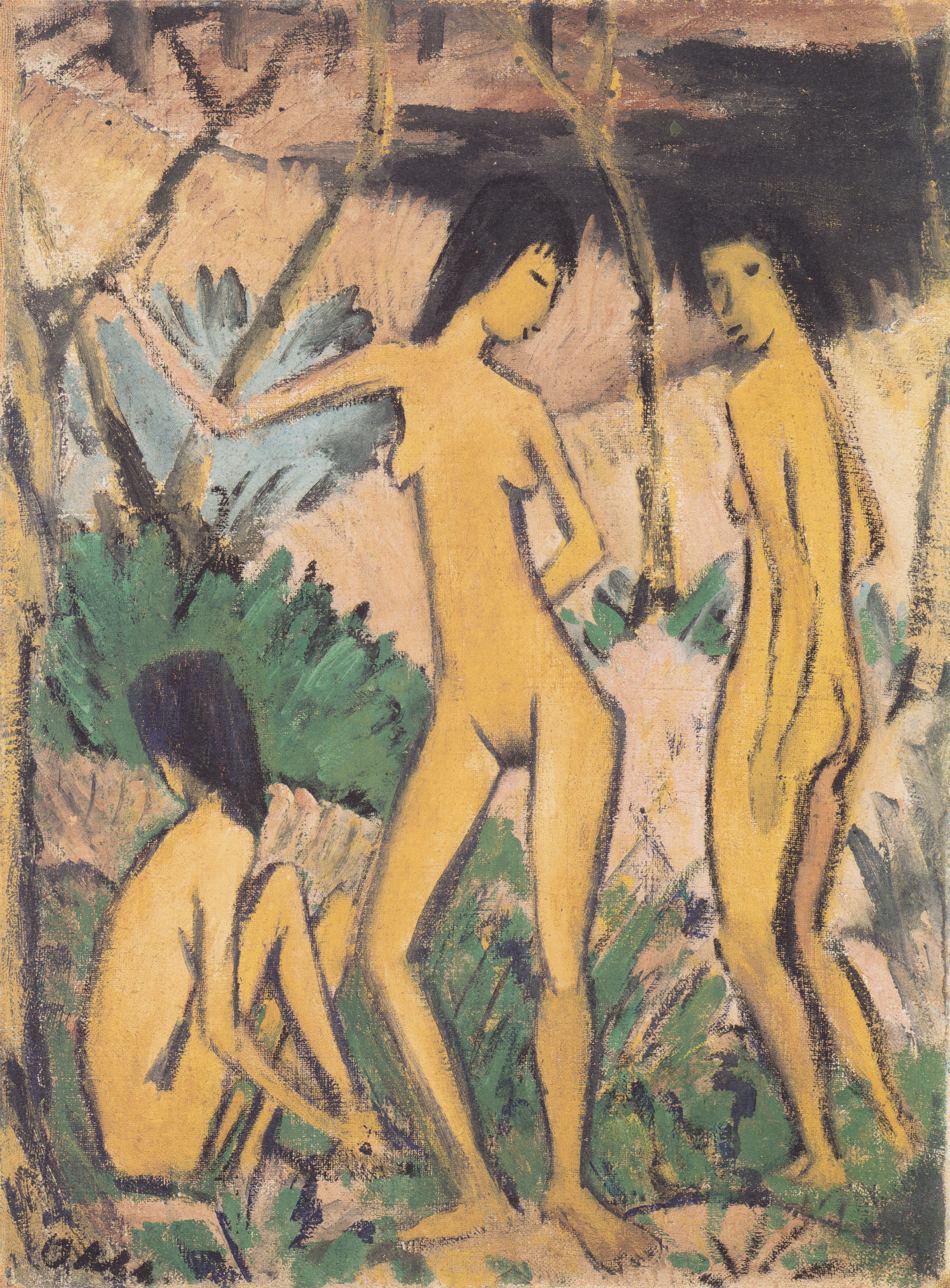
Three Nudes in a Landscape (Drei Akte in Landschaft', 1919, tempera on canvas, Brücke Museum, in Berlin

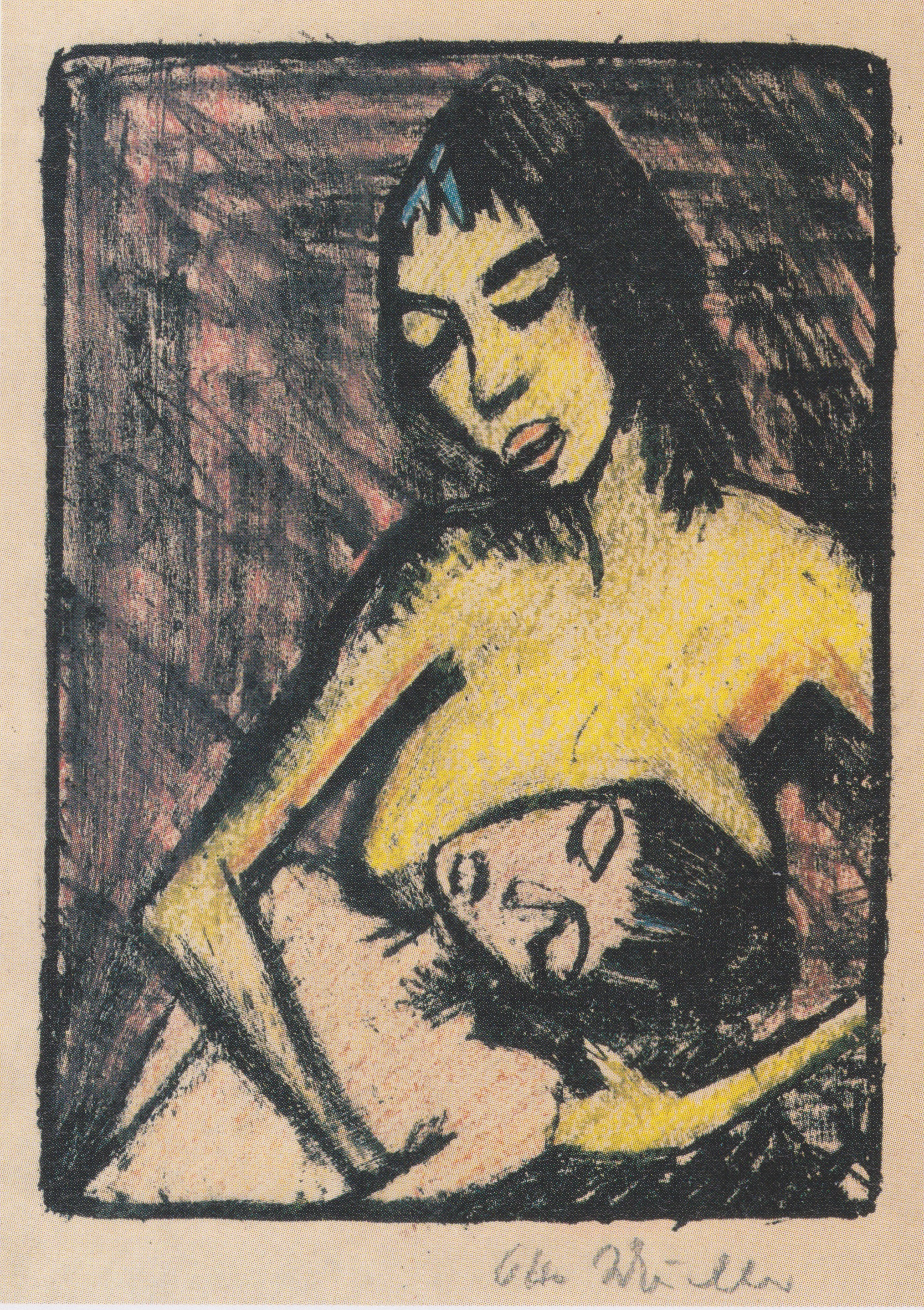
Mother and Child 2. (Mutter und Kind 2.), 1920, lithograph on paper, 26 x 18.7 cm

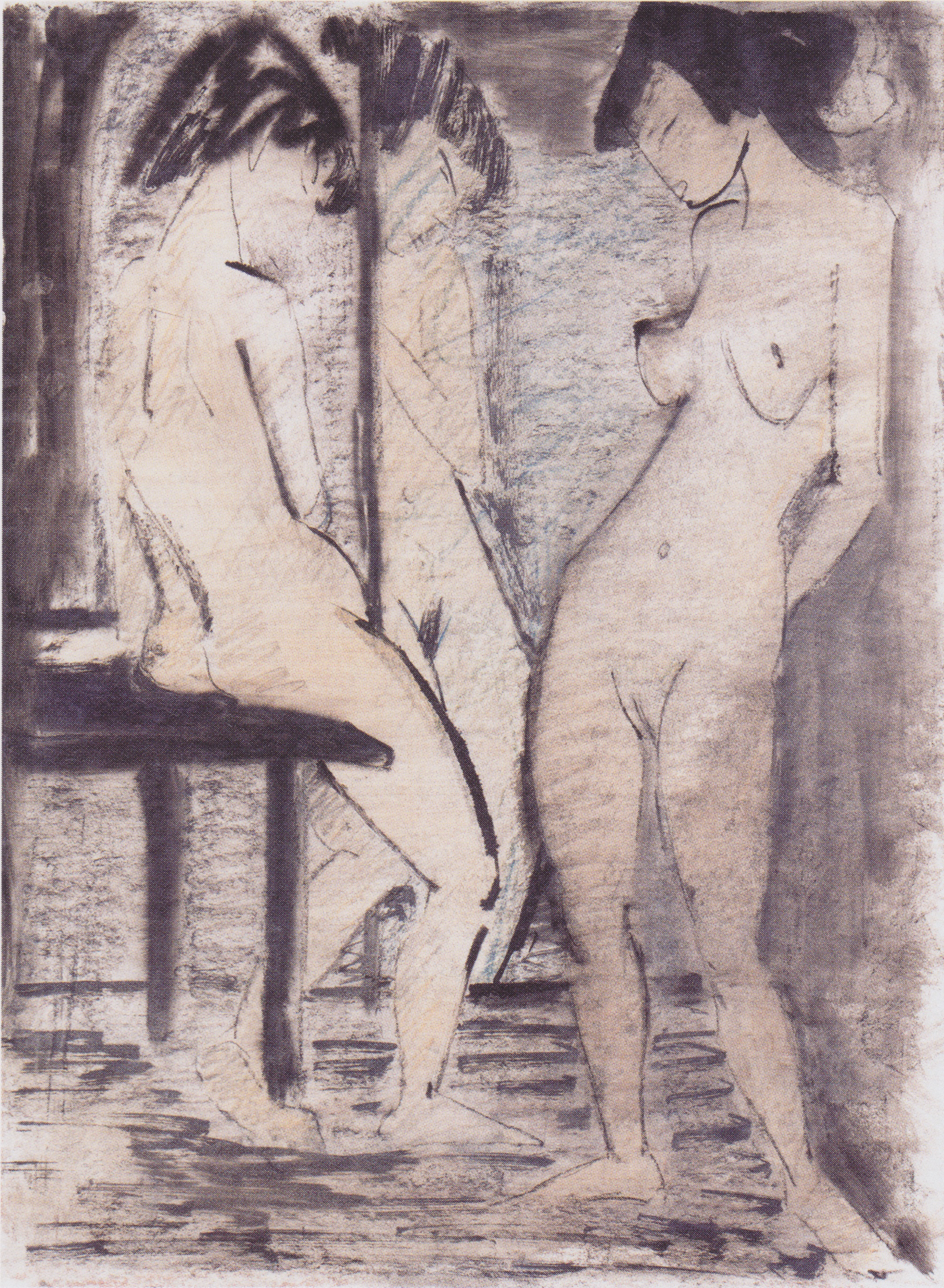
Three Figures (Drei Akte)), c. 1925, watercolor and colored chalk on paper, 68 x 50 cm, Museum am Ostwall, Dortmund

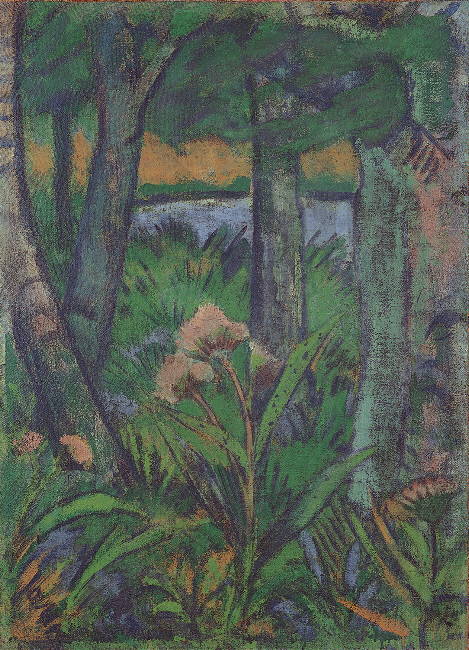
Forest with flowers and pond, c. 1925, distemper on jute, 106.5 x 77 cm

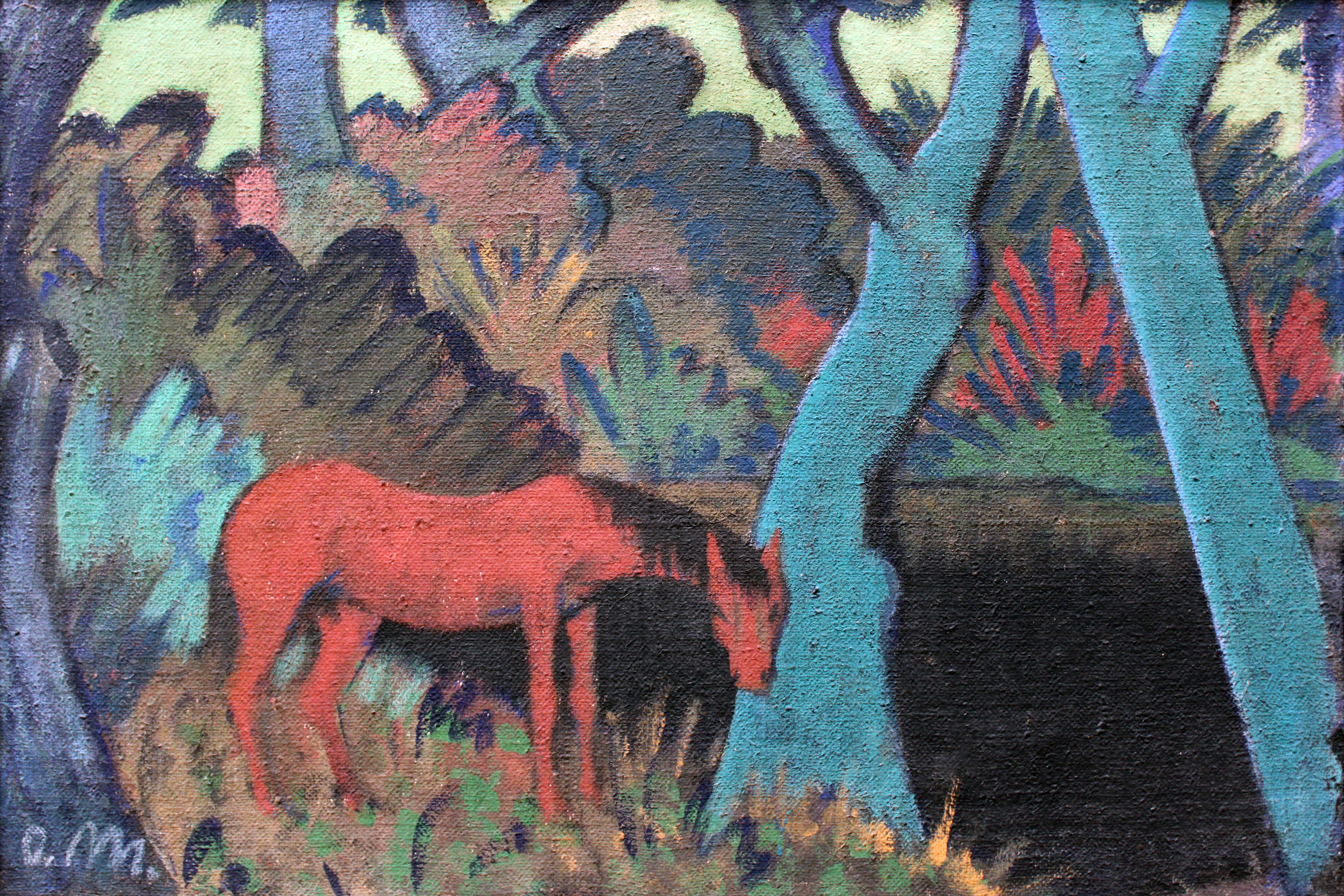
Gypsy horse at black water, 1928, Germanisches Nationalmuseum
