= Augusta von Zitzewitz =

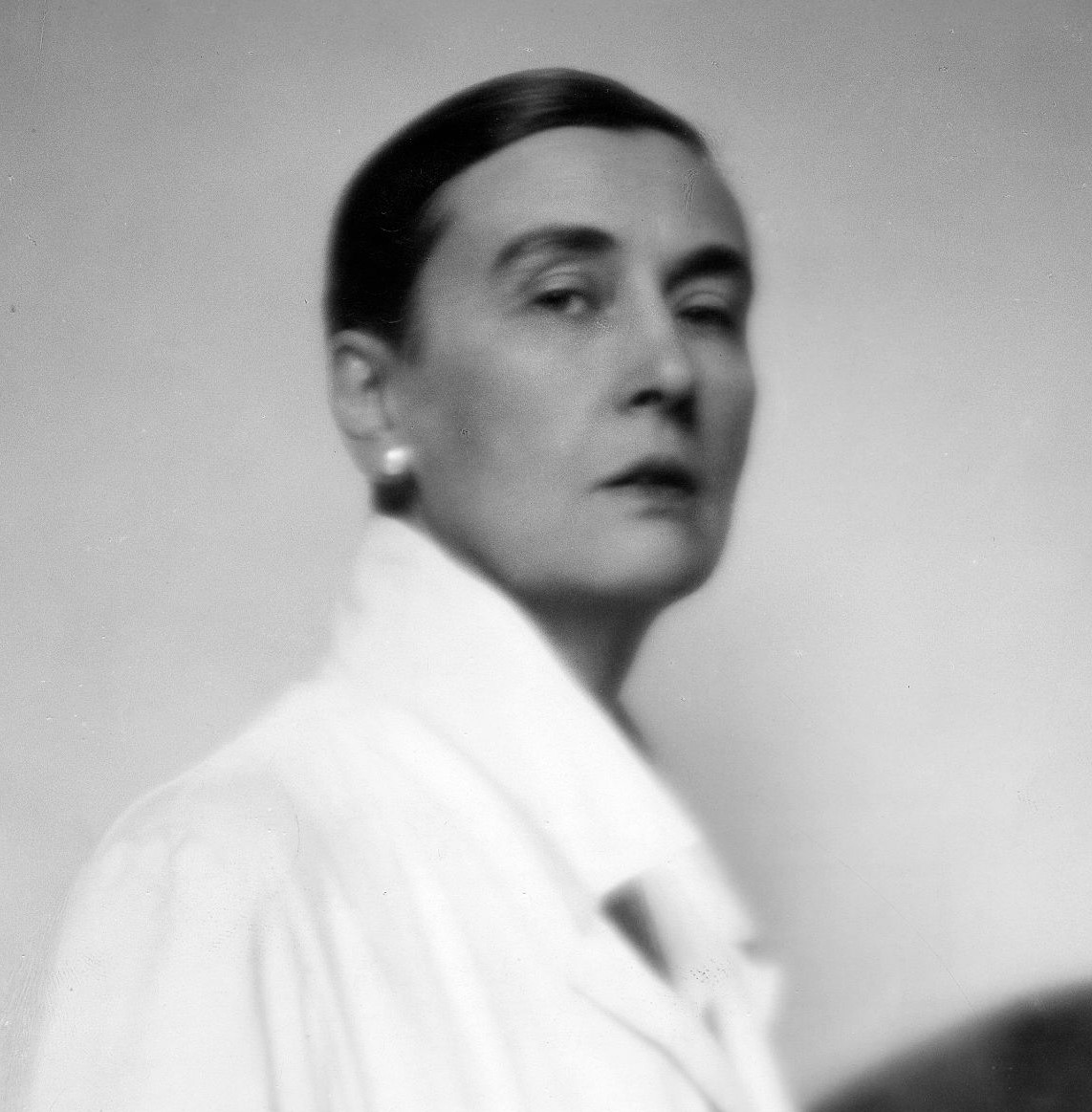
- Augusta von Zitzewitz by Mario von Bucovich, ca 1930
- Born: 26 December 1880; Berlin, German Empire
- Died: 14 November 1960 (aged 79); West Berlin, West Germany
- Occupation: artist
- Spouse: Erich Römer (1888-1934)
- Children: Ilse-Marie Römer (1915-1964)
- Parent(s): Coelestin Friedrich Adolf Karl von Zitzewitz (1847-1892); Elise Köbel (1847-1922)

Augusta von Zitzewitz (26 December 1880 – 14 November 1960) was a German artist, based, for most of her working life, in Berlin. Early on in her career she was associated with the Berlin Secession movement. She is best known for her portraits.

== Life ==
Augusta von Zitzewitz was born in Berlin, a daughter of the Prussian Oberleutnant Coelestin Friedrich von Zitzewitz and his wife, born Elise Köbel. Because of her mother's English provenance she and her eight siblings grew up bilingual. According to family tradition she was christened "Augusta" after the empress Augusta of Saxe-Weimar-Eisenach (1811-1890), the politically liberal wife of the old German emperor. Her father died in 1892, a few months after her eleventh birthday, and she was sent away to complete her education at the "Kaiserin-Augusta-Stift", a Potsdam boarding school which later formed the unsympathetic backdrop for Christa Winsloe's drama, Girls in Uniform.

In 1907, presumably with the backing of her widowed mother, in 1907, she embarked on an arts training with the Berlin Association of Women Artists ("Verein der Berliner Künstlerinnen"). An arts training at one of the more mainstream Berlin academies would not have been accessible to her on account of her gender. One of her teachers during the next few years was the "Secessionist", George Mosson. She rented her own little studio in 1911, the year in which she was admitted to membership of the Berlin Association of Women Artists.

She had been urged by Käthe Kollwitz to familiarise herself with modern art trends and artists in Paris. In Autumn 1912 she went to Paris to study at the Académie Julian. She also studied with the Cubist, Jean Metzinger. Her studies in Paris, where she was also taught by André Dunoyer de Segonzac and Henri Le Fauconnier, continued till 1914. Her friends Helen Grund and Fanny Remark were also studying in Paris at this time. Along with her studies, von Zitzewitz found time in Paris to make contact with the art dealer Israel Ber Neumann and to spend time with the circle of avant-garde cubists around Henri Matisse who would gather at the Café du Dome.

Augusta von Zitzewitz married the art-historian Erich Römer (1888-1934) in 1914. Their daughter, Ilse-Marie Römer (1915-1964) was born the next year. Ilse-Marie would later often model for her mother.

It was also in 1915 that she became a member of the recently formed Free Secession artists' association. During the next couple of decades she established herself as an artist, producing landscapes, interiors, still lifes and nudes. Notable portrait subjects included members of the Berlin intellectual and cultural milieu such as Alfred Kerr, Max Herrmann-Neisse, Louise Schröder, Claire Waldoff and Renée Sintenis. She also had an important sideline in woodcut prints, notably for the radical leftwing political weekly Die Aktion, between 1917 and 1932. Her mother died in 1922. From this point till she died Augusta von Zitzewitz lived at Reichsstraße 97 in Berlin-Westend.

At the start of 1933 the Nazis took power and lost no time in transforming the country into a one-party dictatorship. In opposition the Nazis had based their appeal on the traditional populist twin pillars of hatred and hope. The shrill antisemitism on display at Nazi meeting during the 1920s was integrated into government strategy in ways that many found hard to comprehend. Erich Römer was identified by the authorities as Jewish, which meant that the couple's daughter, Ilse, was classified as half-Jewish. Between 1933 and 1945 Augusta von Zitzewitz was subjected to a ban on working or exhibiting inside Germany. The Nazi writ did not run in North America, however, and she was able to exhibit at the Carnegie Institute in Pittsburgh. Ilse faced additional race-based risks and was prevented from attending secondary school.

Despite the ban, she produced a succession of further portraits on a private basis. As a full member of the German Artists' Association, she participated in its activities until the forcible closure in 1936 of the Hamburg Kunsverein Exhibition by the government backed "State Chamber of Visual Artists" ("Reichskammer der bildenden Künste").

War ended in May 1945, and with it the Nazi régime. Berlin was divided into military occupation zones. Von Zitzewitz returned to her destroyed studio in Berlin-Charlottenburg (Reichstraßestraße 97) which she had left shortly before the war ended. Charlottenburg had ended up at the heart of what became West Berlin. The priority was on survival. She painted portraits using the light from a kerosene lamp and exchanged them for food. And as the rubble began to be cleared and the rebuilding got under way she re-established her place in the arts scene, once more painting leading figures from the literary and arts scenes. She was now able to stage exhibitions across West Germany, notably in Munich, Hamburg and Bremen. There were exhibitions in Berlin-Charlottenburg in 1950 and 1958, followed in 1961 by a posthumous commemorative exhibition in the context of that year's Greater Berlin Arts Exhibition. Another notable posthumous exhibition, arranged by the Pomerania Foundation ("Stiftung Pommern") at Kiel Castle (Rantzau building) in 1980/81, celebrated the centenary of her birth.

== Celebration ==
At the house where she lived and worked (Reichsstr. 96/97, 14052 Berlin), a wall-mounted tablet commemorating Augusta von Zitzewitz was unveiled on 17 August 2003.
