= Free Secession =

Otto Beyer: In der Mittagshitze, 1919

The Free Secession (German: Freie Secession) was an association of modern artists in Berlin organizing joint exhibitions 1914–1923.

The Free Secession was formed after 42 members in late 1913 left the Berlin Secession, which thereby lost a majority of its members and nearly all of its most prominent artists. Max Liebermann, a former co-founder and leader of the Berlin Secession was made honorary president of the Free Secession.

== Notable members ==
- Ernst Barlach
- Max Beckmann
- Theo von Brockhusen
- Charles Crodel
- Georg Kolbe
- Käthe Kollwitz
- August Kraus
- Rudolf Levy
- Wilhelm Lehmbruck
- Max Liebermann
- Hans Purrmann
- Richard Scheibe
- Karl Schmidt-Rottluff
- Max Slevogt
- Wilhelm Trübner
- Henry van de Velde
- Heinrich Zille
- Augusta von Zitzewitz
