= Die Brücke =

German expressionist artist group

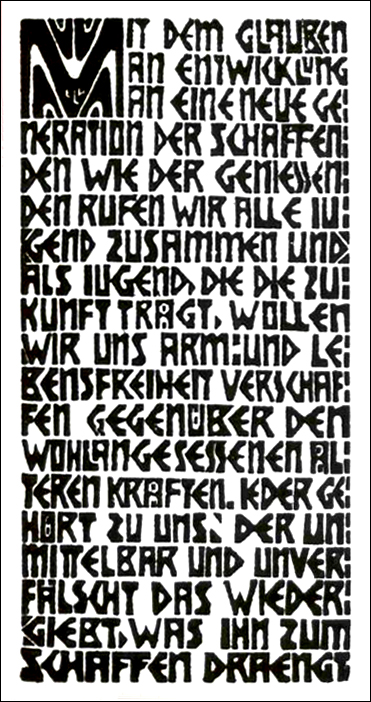
Brücke manifesto 1906

Die Brücke (German pronunciation: [diː ˈbʁʏkə], "The Bridge"), also known as Künstlergruppe Brücke or KG Brücke, was a group of German expressionist artists formed in Dresden in 1905. The founding members were Fritz Bleyl, Erich Heckel, Ernst Ludwig Kirchner, and Karl Schmidt-Rottluff. Later members were Emil Nolde, Max Pechstein, and Otto Mueller. The seminal group had a major impact on the evolution of modern art in the 20th century and the creation of expressionism. The group came to an end around 1913. The Brücke Museum in Berlin was named after the group.

The Brücke is sometimes compared to the roughly contemporary French group of the Fauves. Both movements shared interests in primitivist art and in the expressing of extreme emotion through high-keyed colors that were very often non-naturalistic. Both movements employed a drawing technique that was crude, and both groups shared an antipathy to complete abstraction. The Brücke artists' emotionally agitated paintings of city streets and sexually charged events transpiring in country settings made their French counterparts, the Fauves, seem tame by comparison.

== History ==
The founding members of the Brücke in 1905 were four Jugendstil architecture students: Fritz Bleyl (1880–1966), Erich Heckel (1883–1970), Ernst Ludwig Kirchner (1880–1938) and Karl Schmidt-Rottluff (1884–1976). They met through the Royal Saxon Polytechnicum in Dresden, where Kirchner and Bleyl began studying in 1901 and became close friends in their first term. They discussed art together and also studied nature, having a radical outlook in common. Kirchner continued studies at the Polytechnic School of Munich and the Debschitz-Schule in Munich from 1903 to 1904, returning to Dresden in 1905 to complete his degree. The institution provided a wide range of studies in addition to architecture, such as freehand drawing, perspective drawing and the historical study of art. The name "Brücke" was intended to "symbolize the link, or bridge, they would form with art of the future".

The Die Brücke group had a two-tiered membership system: the artists themselves constituted the active membership, while their patrons and supporters, such as Otto Gussmann, a professor of decorative painting, constituted the passive membership. Passive members received portfolios of original prints, a membership card, and other perks in exchange for an annual contribution.

The Brücke aimed to eschew the prevalent traditional academic style and find a new mode of artistic expression, which would form a bridge (hence the name) between the past and the present. They responded both to past artists such as Albrecht Dürer, Matthias Grünewald and Lucas Cranach the Elder, as well as contemporary international avant-garde movements. The group published a broadside called Programm der Künstlergruppe Brücke in 1906, where Kirchner wrote:

"We call all young people together, and as young people, who carry the future in us, we want to wrest freedom for our actions and our lives from the older, comfortably established forces."

— Ernst Ludwig Kirchner, Programm der Künstlergruppe Brücke, Programm der Künstlergruppe Brücke

As part of the affirmation of their national heritage, they revived older media, particularly woodcut prints. The group developed a common style based on vivid color, emotional tension, violent imagery, and an influence from primitivism. After first concentrating exclusively on urban subject matter, the group ventured into southern Germany on expeditions arranged by Mueller and produced more nudes and arcadian images. They invented the printmaking technique of linocut, although they at first described them as traditional woodcuts, which they also made.

The group members initially "isolated" themselves in a working-class neighborhood of Dresden, aiming thereby to reject their own bourgeois backgrounds. Erich Heckel was able to obtain an empty butcher's shop on the Berlinerstrasse in Friedrichstadt for their use as a studio. Bleyl described the studio as:

that of a real bohemian, full of paintings lying all over the place, drawings, books and artist's materials — much more like an artist's romantic lodgings than the home of a well-organised architecture student.

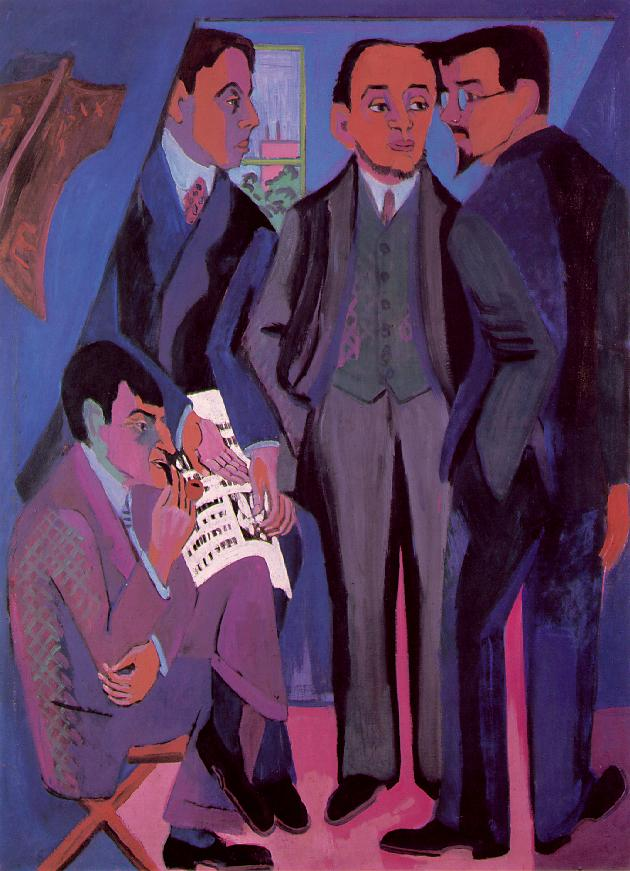
Painting of the group members by Ernst Ludwig Kirchner 1926/7, Museum Ludwig, Cologne

Kirchner's studio became a venue which overthrew social conventions to allow casual love-making and frequent nudity. Group life-drawing sessions took place using models from the social circle, rather than professionals, and choosing quarter-hour poses to encourage spontaneity. Bleyl described one such model, Isabella, a fifteen-year-old girl from the neighbourhood, as "a very lively, beautifully built, joyous individual, without any deformation caused by the silly fashion of the corset and completely suitable to our artistic demands, especially in the blossoming condition of her girlish buds."

The group composed a manifesto (mostly Kirchner's work), which was carved on wood and asserted a new generation, "who want freedom in our work and in our lives, independence from older, established forces." For the manifesto, Kirchner designed in 1906 a highly abstracted figure carved from wood, which was inspired by the craftsmanship of the Fungom region in Cameroon. Even in his later work, Kirchner was strongly influenced by the artistic styles of Cameroon.

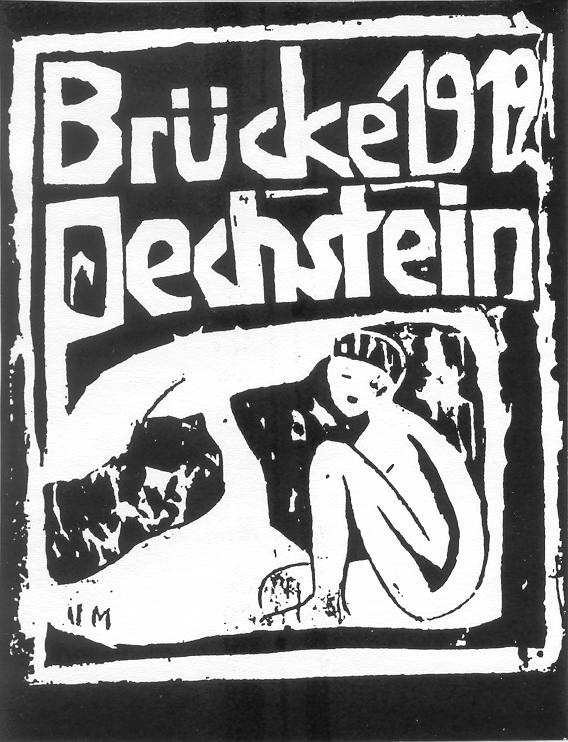
Otto Mueller, 1912

In September and October 1906, the first group exhibition was held, focused on the female nude, in the showroom of K.F.M. Seifert and Co. in Dresden.

Emil Nolde (1867–1956) and Max Pechstein (1881–1955) joined the group in 1906. Bleyl married in 1907, and, with a concern to support his family, left the group. Otto Mueller (1874–1930) joined in 1910.

Between 1907 and 1911, Brücke members stayed during the summer at the Moritzburg lakes and on the island of Fehmarn. In 1911, Kirchner moved to Berlin, where he founded a private art school, MIUM-Institut, in collaboration with Max Pechstein with the aim of promulgating "Moderner Unterricht im Malen" (modern teaching of painting). This was not a success and closed the following year.

In 1913, Kirchner wrote Chronik der Brücke (Brücke chronicle), which led to the ending of the group.

== Legacy ==
The Brücke was one of two groups of German painters fundamental to Expressionism, the other being Der Blaue Reiter group ("The Blue Rider"), formed in Munich in 1911. The influence of the Brücke went far beyond its founding members. As a result, the style of a number of painters is associated to the Brücke, even if they were not formerly part of the group. As an example, French academician and art specialist, Maurice Rheims mentions Frédéric Fiebig as the only Latvian painter who was really part of the Brücke expressionist movement, although he was not necessarily conscious of it.
