= Max Pechstein =

German painter (1881–1955)

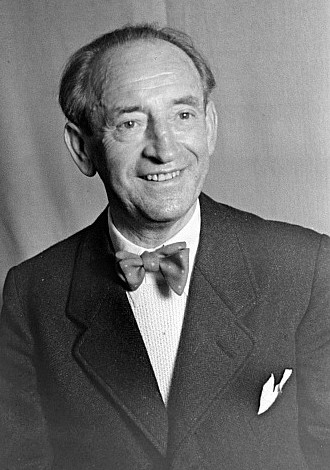
- Pechstein in 1946
- Born: 31 December 1881; Zwickau, German Empire
- Died: 29 August 1955 (aged 73); West Berlin, West Germany
- Education: School of Applied Arts, Dresden; Royal Art Academy, Dresden
- Known for: Painting, printmaking
- Style: Expressionism
- Movement: Die Brücke

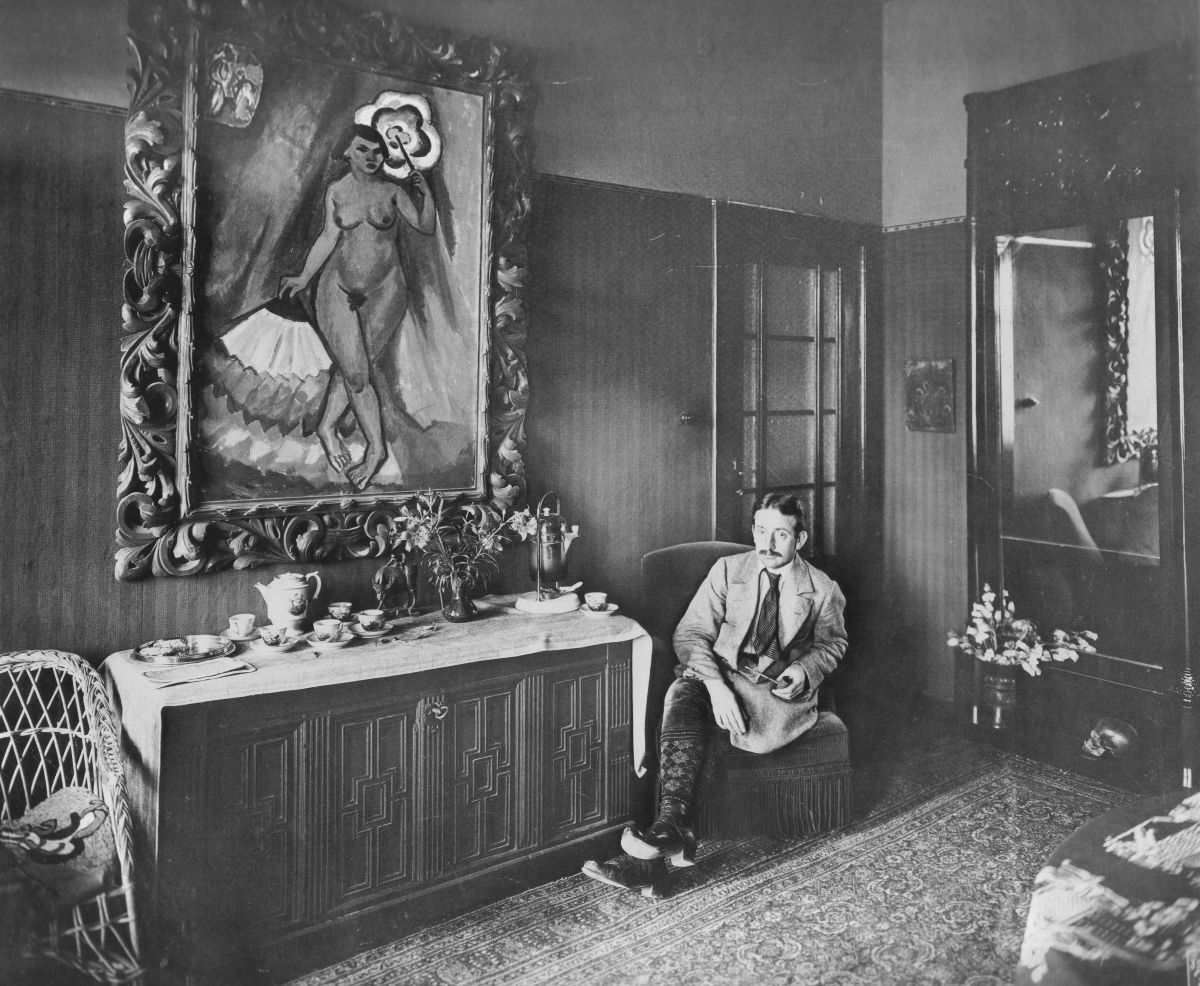
Max Pechstein in his house in Berlin-Zehlendorf, 1915

Max Pechstein, 1911, Under the Trees (Akte im Freien), oil on canvas, 73.6 × 99 cm (29 × 39 in), Detroit Institute of Arts

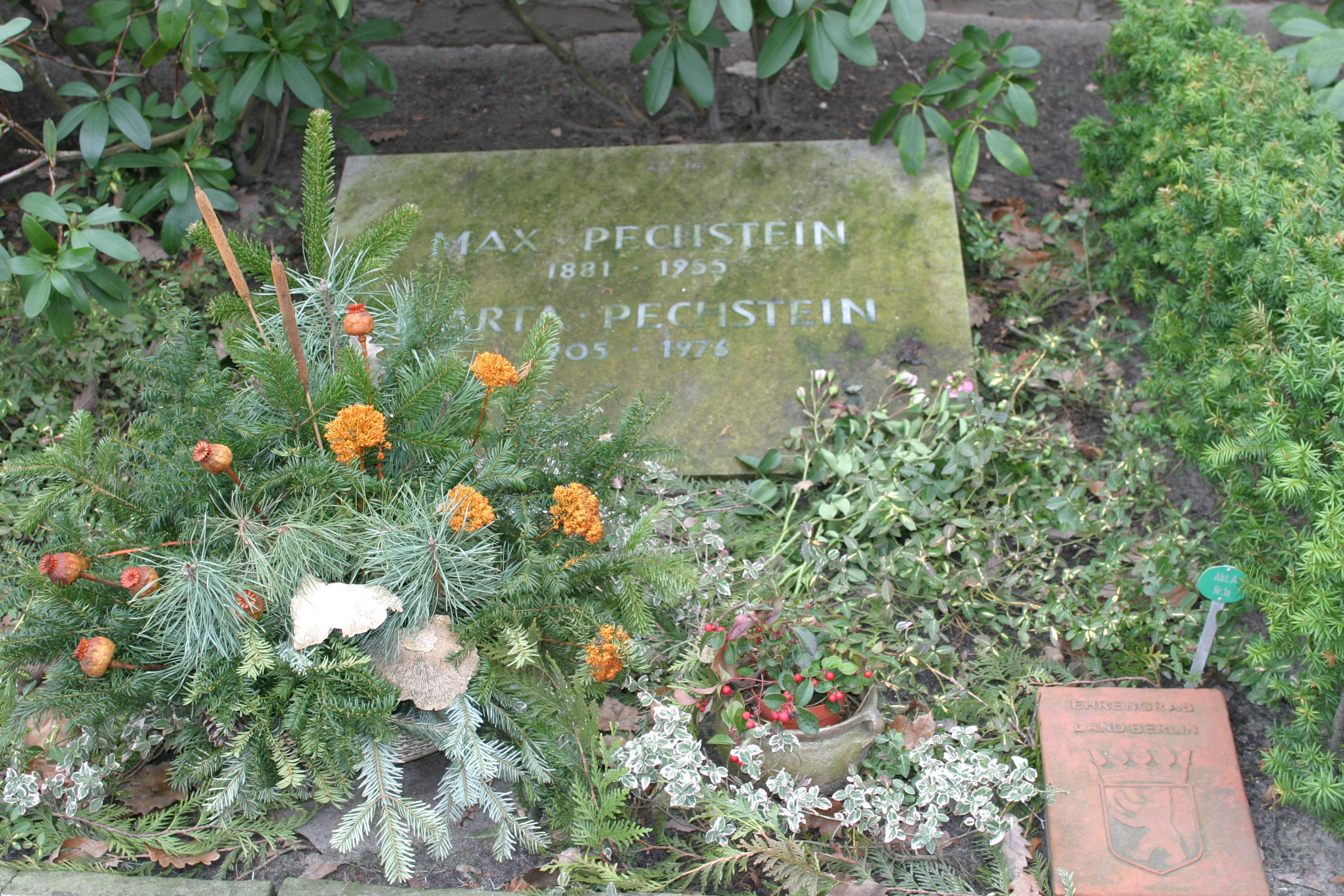
Grave of Max Pechstein in the Evangelischer Friedhof Schmargendorf in Berlin

Hermann Max Pechstein (German pronunciation: [ˈmaks ˈpɛçʃtaɪn]; 31 December 1881 – 29 June 1955) was a German expressionist painter and printmaker and a member of the Die Brücke group. He fought on the Western Front during World War I and his art was classified as Degenerate Art by the Nazis. More than 300 paintings were removed from German Museums during the Nazi era.

== Life and career ==
Pechstein was born in Zwickau, the son of a craftsman who worked in a textile mill. The family of eight lived on the father's salary. An early contact with the art of Vincent van Gogh stimulated Pechstein's development toward expressionism. He first worked as a decorator in his home town before enrolling at the School of Applied Arts and then at the Royal Art Academy in Dresden, where he met the painter Otto Gussman and the architect Wilhelm Kreis. It was here, starting in 1902, that he became a pupil of Gussmann; a relationship that lasted until 1906 when Pechstein met Erich Heckel and was invited to join the art group Die Brücke. He was the only member to have received formal art training. He was an active member of the Brücke until 1910 and often worked alongside Brücke painters creating a homogeneous style of this period. In 1905 he was in Dresden where the museum of ethnology showed wood carvings from the South Seas. As a result he developed his first woodcut.

In 1907 Pechstein traveled to Italy to receive an award, and upon his return in 1908 spent time in Paris where he met the Fauvist painter Kees van Dongen whom he persuaded to join Die Brücke. Later that year Pechstein moved to Berlin (a move that fellow painters were to make in the following three years). After being categorically rejected from exhibiting in the Berlin Secession in 1910, he helped to found and became chairman of the New Secession and gained recognition for his decorative and colorful prints that were inspired by the art of Van Gogh, Matisse, and the Fauves.

In 1912, after years of rising tensions, Pechstein was expelled from the Brücke after exhibiting some of his work in the aforementioned Berlin Secession all by himself and without paintings of other members of the Brücke. This expulsion was a relatively happy one as Pechstein had been receiving rewards and recognition far beyond his peers owing to his conservative style that appealed to a wider audience. This recognition only distanced him from the group and bred animosity among the members. His paintings eventually became more primitivist, incorporating thick black lines and angular figures. Looking for inspiration, he traveled to Palau in the Pacific Ocean. Upon the outbreak of World War I, Pechstein was interned in Japan and returned to Germany via Shanghai, Manila, and New York. He was sent to fight on the Western Front (World War I) in 1916. Despite his notably conservative stance and style, after the German Revolution of 1918–19, Pechstein joined two radical socialist groups: the Arbeitsrat für Kunst and the November Group (German). Beginning in 1922, Pechstein became a professor at the Berlin Academy.

Beginning in 1933, Pechstein was vilified by the Nazis because of his art. He was banned from painting or exhibiting his art and later that year was fired from his teaching position. A total of 326 of his paintings were removed from German museums. Sixteen of his works were displayed in the Entartete Kunst (Degenerate Art) exhibition of 1937. During this time, Pechstein went into seclusion in rural Pomerania. He was reinstated in 1945, and subsequently won numerous titles and awards for his work.

Many of Pechstein's collectors were Jews whose collections were seized by the Nazis or lost owing to Nazi persecution. In May 2013 the Bavarian State Paintings Collections agreed to restitute Pechstein's White House, (1910) and his Meadow Valley (1911) to the heirs of Curt Glaser. In July 2021, France decided to restitute to the heirs of Hugo Simon the Pechstein entitled Nus dans un paysage. In 2023, Christie's brokered a settlement with the heirs of Robert Graetz, a Jewish textile industrialist and art collector who was deported and murdered by the Nazis, concerning Still Life With a Cup, which Graetz's daughter sold as a refugee in South Africa.

He was a prolific printmaker, producing 421 lithographs, 315 woodcuts and linocuts, and 165 intaglio prints, mostly etchings.

== Personal life ==
He was married to Charlotte Karpolat from 1911 until 1923 and later was married to Marta Möller. He died in West Berlin and is buried in the Evangelischer Friedhof Alt-Schmargendorf in Berlin.

== Works ==
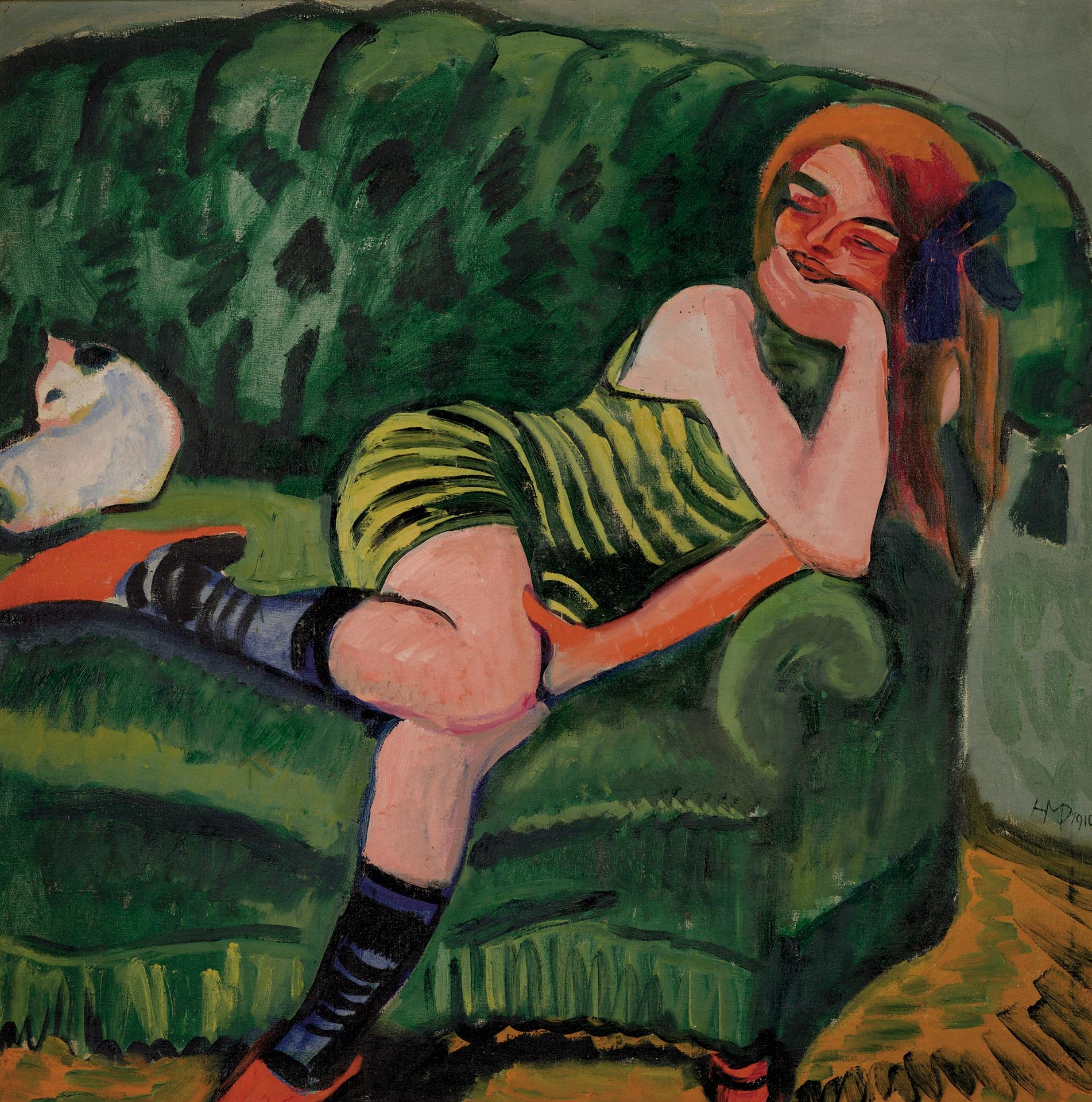
The Green Sofa, 1910, oil on canvas, Museum Ludwig, Cologne

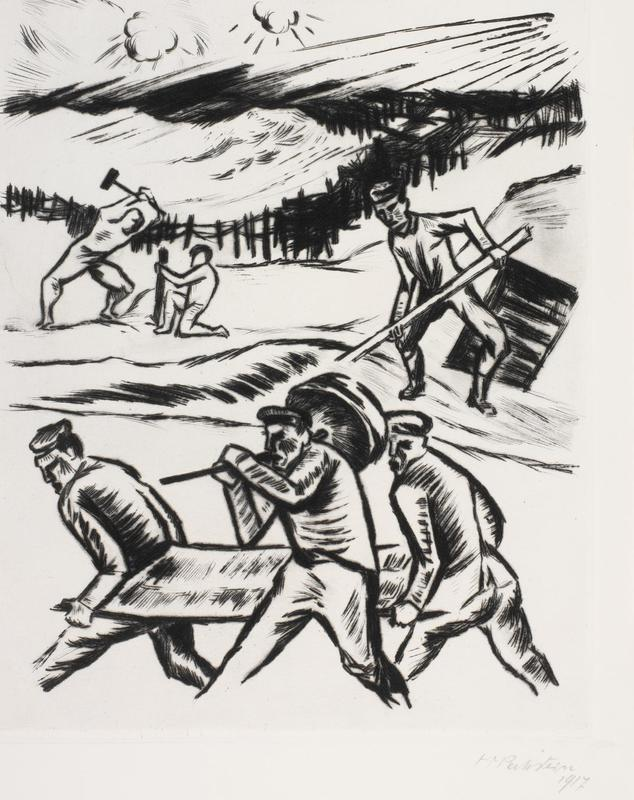
Pechstein, Soldiers Digging a Trench (Soldaten beim Schanzen), 1917, print on paper, Imperial War Museum

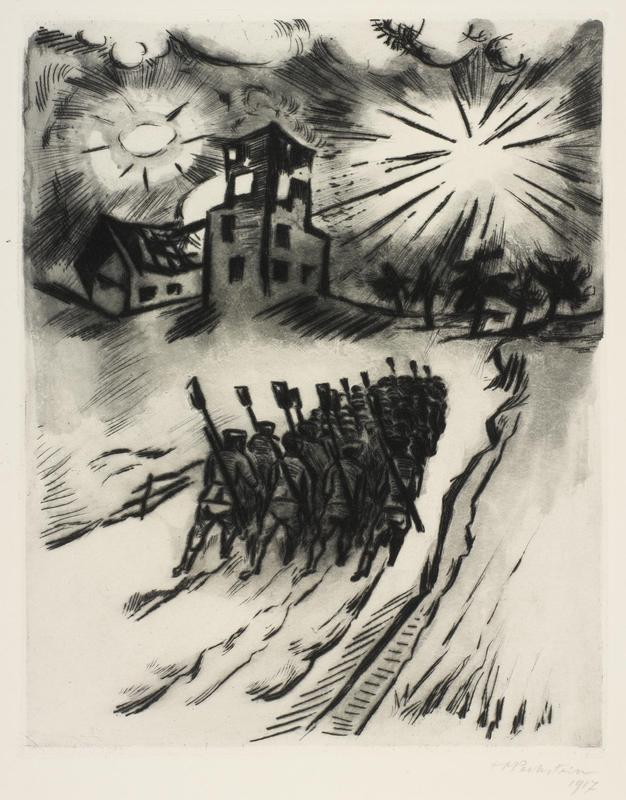
Pechstein, Company on the March (Marschierende Kompanie), 1917, print on paper, Imperial War Museum

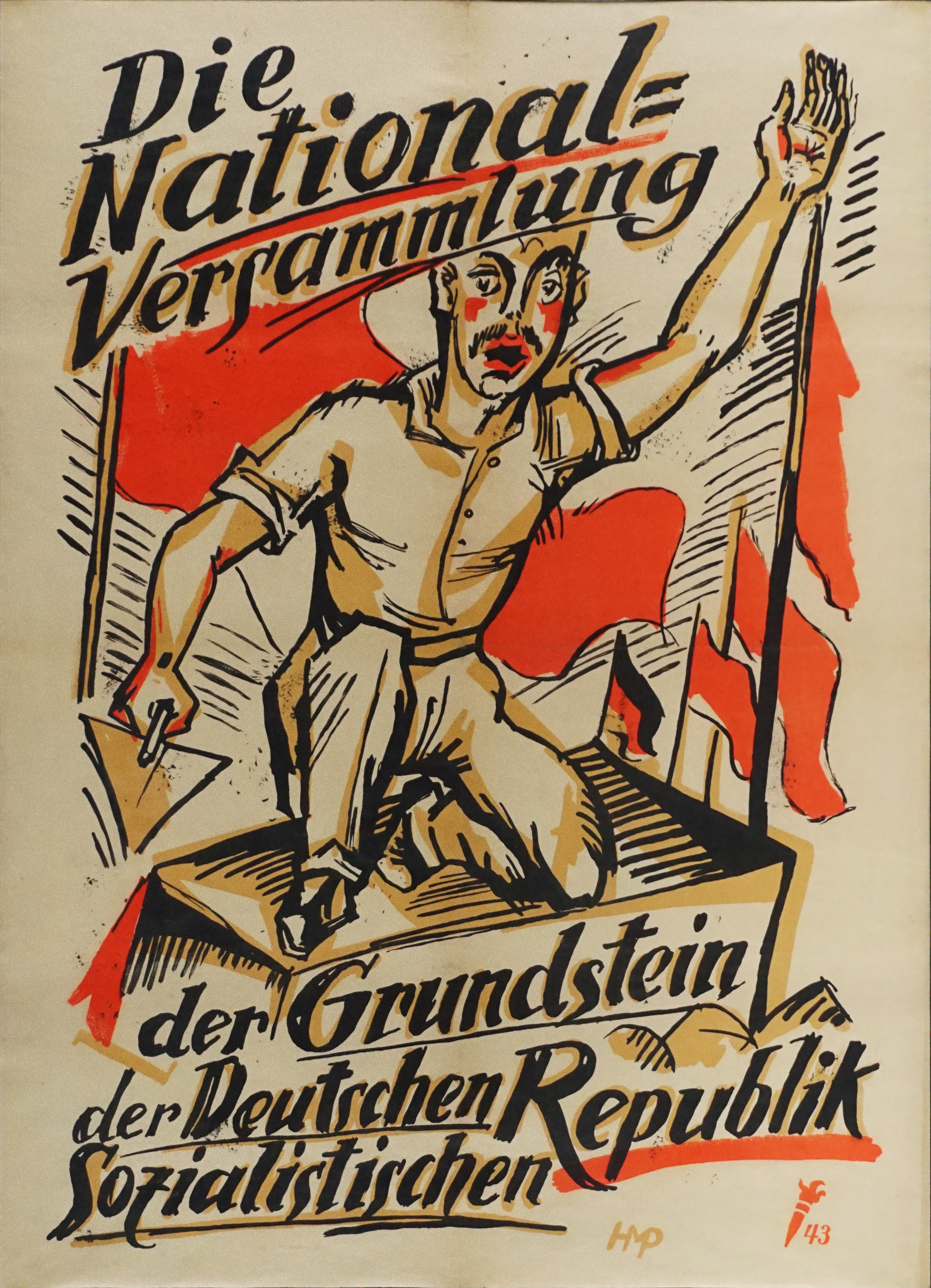
Pechstein, "The National Assembly the Foundation Stone of the German Socialist Republic" (1919)

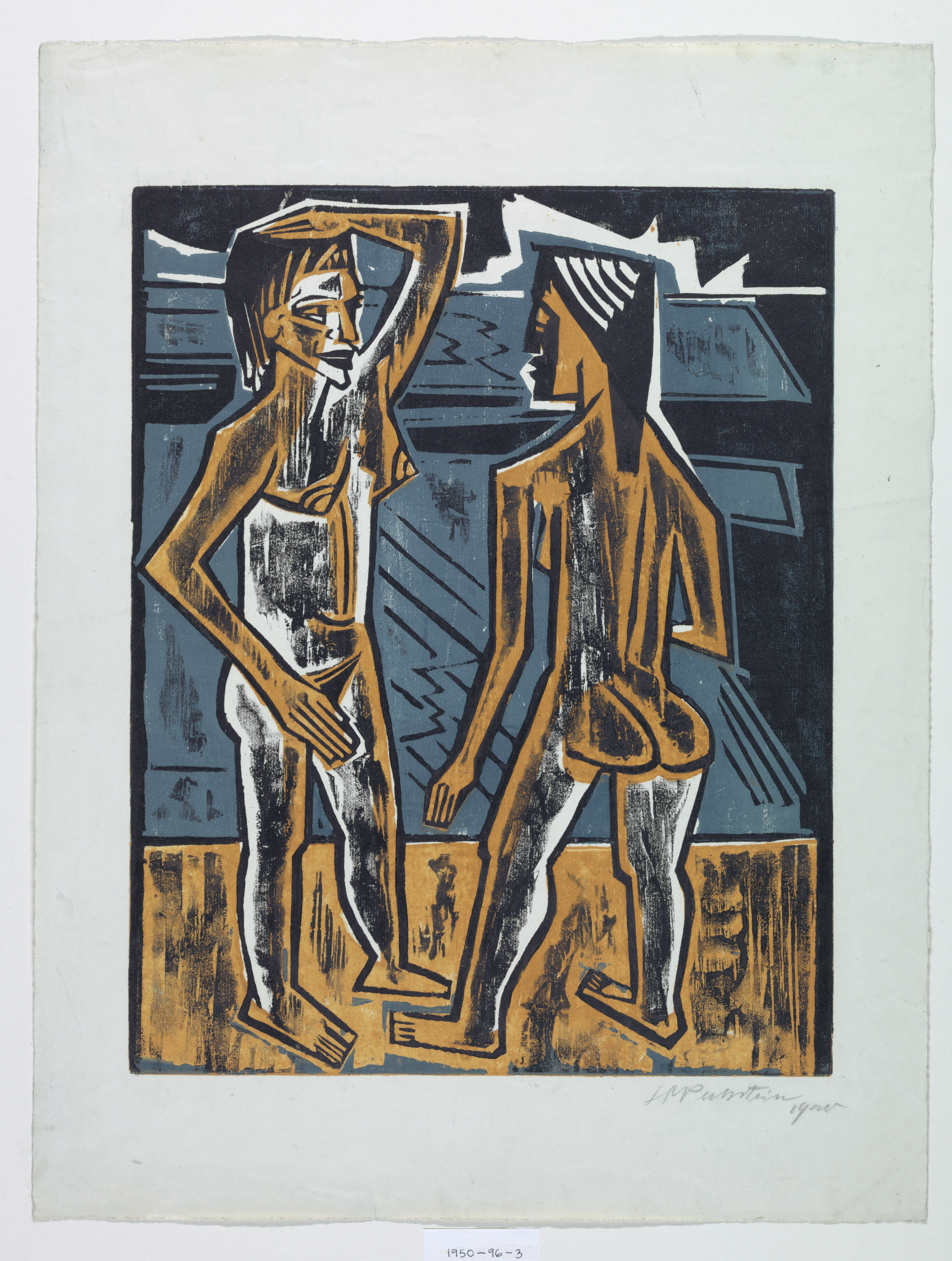
Pechstein, Two standing figures, 1920, woodcut print in black & colored ink on paper, Cooper Hewitt, Smithsonian Design Museum

== Art market ==
At a 1999 Sotheby's auction, The Yellow Mask I (1910), the portrait of a woman wearing a yellow mask, was sold for $1.37 million. In 2008, Zirkus mit Dromedaren (c. 1920) was auctioned for £1.9 million in London.
