= Erich Heckel =

German painter (1883–1970)

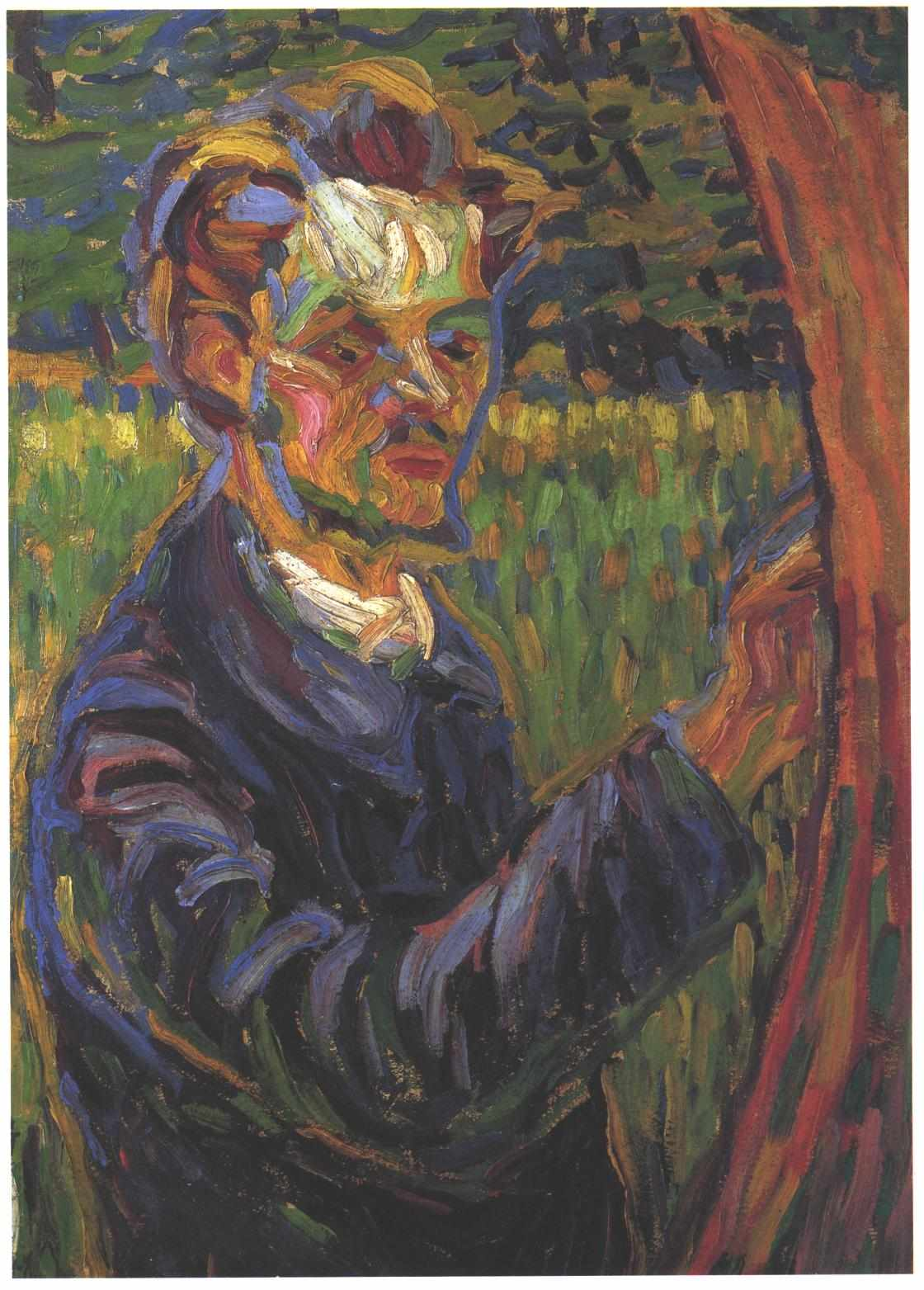
- Heckel painting at the easel – portrait by Ernst Ludwig Kirchner
- Born: 31 July 1883; Döbeln, Kingdom of Saxony, German Empire
- Died: 27 January 1970 (aged 86); Radolfzell, Baden-Württemberg, West Germany
- Education: Königliche Technische Hochschule
- Known for: Painting, woodcuts/printmaking
- Style: Expressionism
- Movement: Die Brücke

Weisses Haus in Dangast, oil painting by Erich Heckel, 1908.

Erich Heckel (31 July 1883 – 27 January 1970) was a German painter and printmaker, and a founding member of the group Die Brücke ("The Bridge") which existed 1905–1913. His work was part of the art competitions at the 1928 Summer Olympics and the 1932 Summer Olympics.

== Biography ==
Heckel was born in Döbeln, Saxony, the son of a railway engineer. Between 1897 and 1904 he attended the Realgymnasium in Chemnitz, before studying architecture in Dresden. He left after three terms, shortly after the foundation of Die Brücke, an artists' group of which he was secretary and treasurer. The other founder-members, also architectural students, were Ernst Ludwig Kirchner, Karl Schmidt-Rottluff and Fritz Bleyl. He worked in the office of the architect Wilhelm Kreis until July 1907, when he resigned to become a full-time artist.

== Career ==
Heckel met the other founding members of Die Brücke, Ernst Ludwig Kirchner, Karl Schmidt-Rottluff, and Fritz Bleyl, while studying architecture in Dresden. The foursome equally regarded pursuing a degree in architecture as a compromise with their respectable middle-class parents who would have never supported them, had they wanted to study art. Heckel attended the Dresden Polytechnic Institute for only eighteen months, after which time he accepted a job as a draughtsman at Wilhem Kreis's architectural studio. He was able to use the position for the benefit of the Brücke. When the firm was asked to design an exhibition room for the lamp manufacturer Max Seifert, Heckel was able to persuade the industrialist that it was worthwhile giving wall space and displays to Die Brücke for an exhibition.

== Art ==
As a member of Die Brücke, Heckel often filled the role of business manager, which allowed the collective to network with other upcoming artists at the time, such as the Munich-based Franz Marc. This subsequently led to greater publicity for the collective, such as their mention in the almanac of Franz Marc's own artistic coalition, the Blaue Reiter.

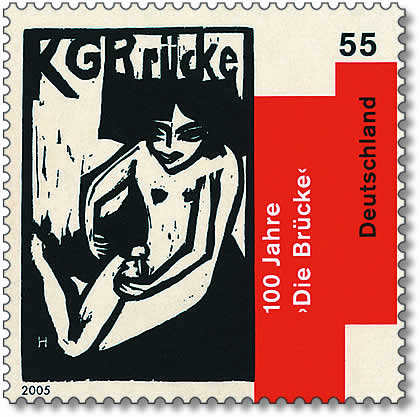
DPAG-2005-DieBrueckeSitzendeFraenzi

It is worthwhile to note that with the exception of one favorable review by Paul Fetcher in the leading Dresden newspaper Dresdner Neueste Nachrichten, the exhibition in Löbtau at the factory of the lamp manufacturer Max Seifert was considered unsuccessful. In addition, Heckel's poster, no longer extant, had been barred from public display by the Dresden police. In 1906 and 1907 the Die Brücke had another exhibition in Löbtau, devoted exclusively to graphics and including a group of woodcuts by Wassily Kandinsky. This exhibit was also not positively received. However, the next three annual shows by the Die Brücke, this time held in the Emil Richter Gallery, garnered attention in the area, including a controversial nude poster of a woman.

Among the group's inspirations were the work of Edvard Munch, and Pre-Colonial African art; it was Heckel's brother who introduced the group to African sculpture.

== From World War I to World War II ==
In December 1911, Heckel moved from Dresden to Berlin. Die Brücke was dissolved in 1913. Heckel volunteered for service in Berlin when the war broke out in 1914. Although he underwent a brief training period, he was ultimately rejected by the army for being too old. He then turned to the Red Cross, joining a hospital train in Flanders in March 1915 as a medical orderly. It was stationed successively in Roeselare, Ostend and Ghent. The platoon was assembled by Walter Kaesbach, a curator from the National Gallery of Berlin, and included painters such as Max Kaus, Otto Herbig and Anton Kerschbaumer, as well as the poet Ernst Morwitz. At a certain moment in Roeselare, Heckel found himself in the same hospital train as Max Beckmann. From May 1915 until the end of the war in November 1918, Heckel served in the Ostend emergency hospital. Housed in the railway station, it was home to a true artists’ colony. The orderlies painted, made woodcuts and read and discussed literature and poetry. They adorned the building with murals and window decorations and produced special works at Christmas. Heckel befriended James Ensor who invited him into his house and his studio. He also continued his artistic activities in Germany. On the home front, he established contacts with collectors and prepared for exhibitions. As a draughtsman, he made numerous sketches of the places he visited and the people he observed. But as a painter, the Flemish landscape and North Sea created the deepest impression, especially the sunlight penetrating the unusual cloud formations.

Between 1922 and 1924 Heckel painted one small, arched room at the invitation of the Angermuseum on the ground floor of the museum. It is now called the Heckelraum. The mural paintings, which were subsequently given the title Lebensstufen (in English: Stages in Life), are considered to be the most important surviving wall paintings of German Expressionism.

In 1937 the Nazi Party declared his work "degenerate"; it forbade him to show his work in public, and more than 700 items of his art were confiscated from German museums. By 1944 all of his woodcut blocks and print plates had been destroyed.

After World War II Heckel lived at Gaienhofen near Lake Constance, teaching at the Karlsruhe Academy until 1955. He continued painting until his death in Radolfzell in 1970.

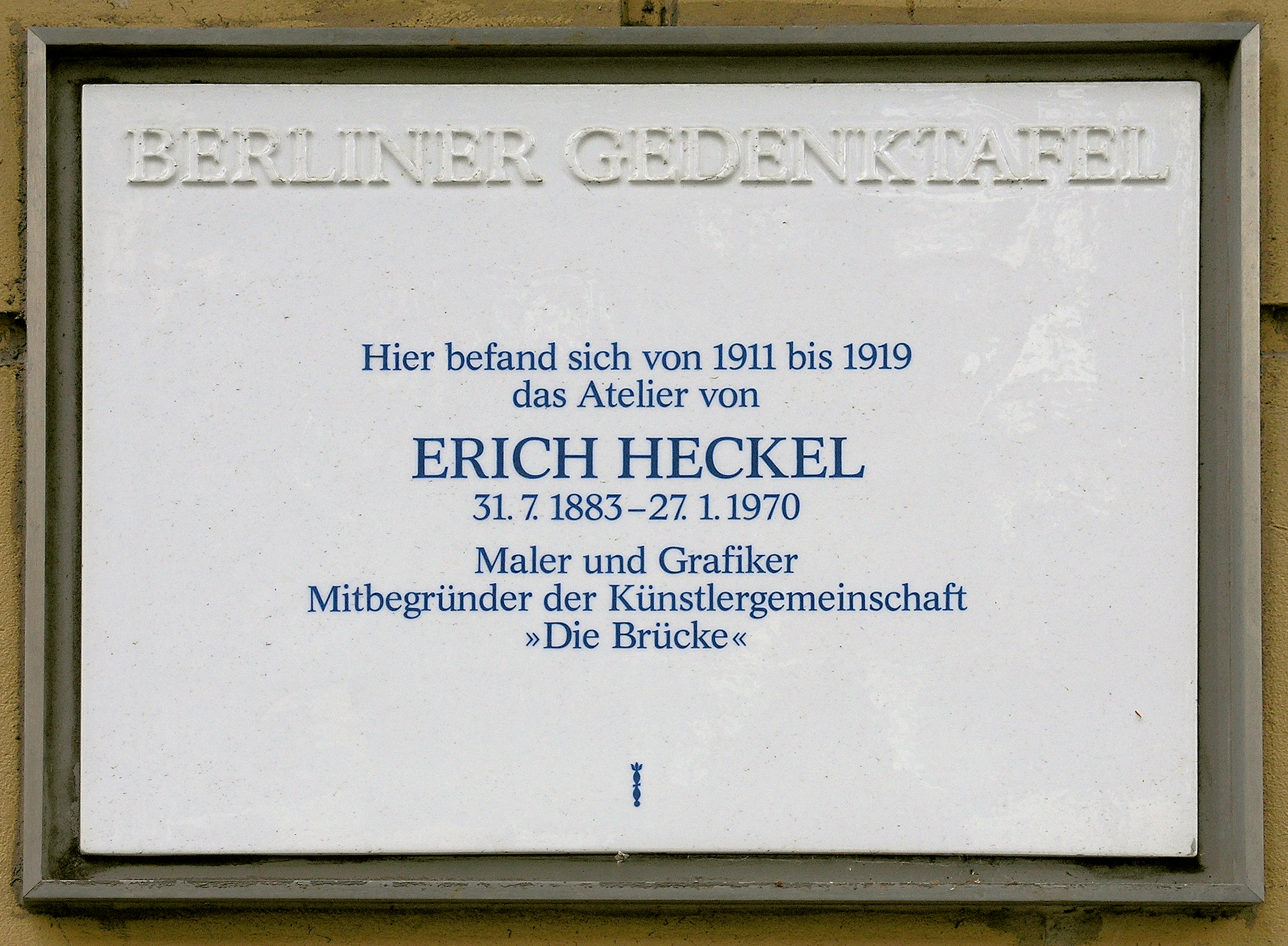
Plaque commemorating Heckel in Berlin

== Legacy ==
Like most members of Die Brücke, he was a prolific printmaker: Dube's catalogues raisonné describe with 465 woodcuts, 375 etchings, and 400 lithographs. More than 200 of them, mostly etchings, are from the last seven years of his life.

A major retrospective exhibition, Erich Heckel – His Work in the 1920s, was held October 2004 – February 2005 at the Brücke Museum in Berlin.

In 2000, Heckel's Dangaster Dorflandschaft (Dangast village landscape) (1909) was sold for £1.21 million at Sotheby's in London.

David Bowie based the cover of his 1977 album "Heroes" on Heckel's painting Roquairol. The same painting also provided the basis for the cover of Iggy Pop's 1977 album The Idiot.

From 9 October 2025 to 12 January 2026, the Neue Galerie exhibited Erich Heckel, a monographic exhibit of works created between 1905 and 1920.

=== Critical reception ===
The critic James Auer has said that Heckel's Franzi Standing

in many ways encapsulates the principal virtues of the entire Expressionist movement. At once frank and respectful, daring and compassionate, it depicts a girl-woman on the cusp of adolescence, innocent and free yet, at the same time, curious and knowing.

== Gallery of work ==
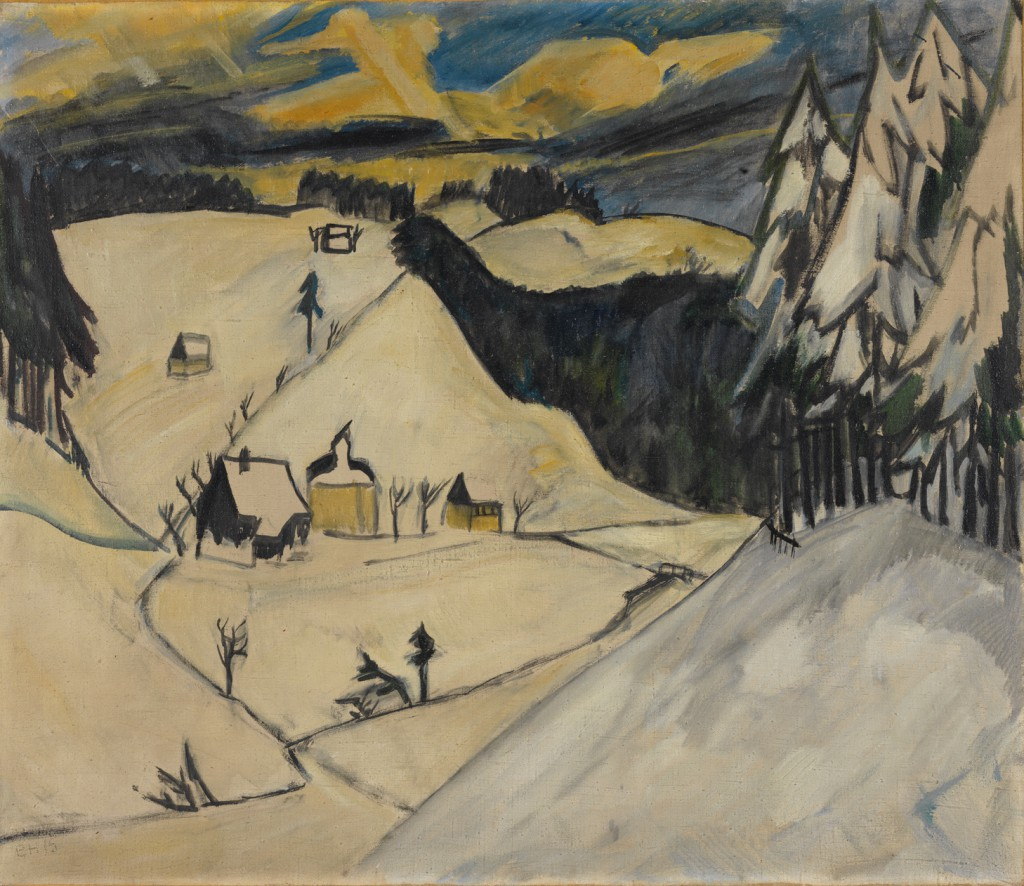
Snow Landscape, 1915, Virginia Museum of Fine Arts, Richmond
