= Last Supper in Christian art =

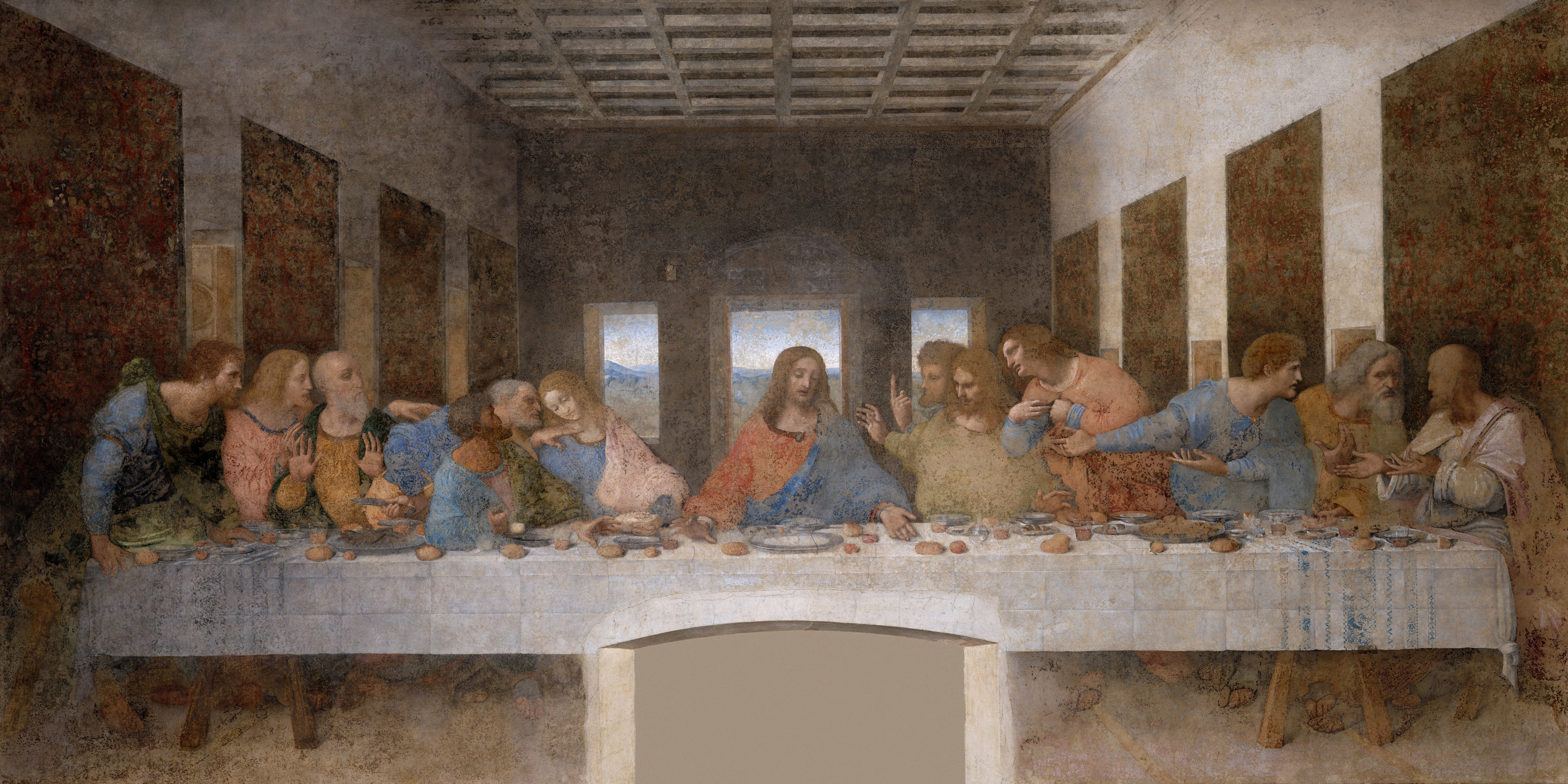
The Last Supper (1495-1498). Mural, tempera on gesso, pitch and mastic, 700 x 880 cm (22.9 x 28.8 ft). In the Santa Maria delle Grazie Church, Milan, Italy, it is Leonardo da Vinci's dramatic interpretation of Jesus' last meal before death. Depictions of the Last Supper in Christian art have been undertaken by artistic masters for centuries, Leonardo da Vinci's late-1490s mural painting, being the best-known example.

The Last Supper of Jesus and the Twelve Apostles has been a popular subject in Christian art, often as part of a cycle showing the Life of Christ. Depictions of the Last Supper in Christian art date back to early Christianity and can be seen in the Catacombs of Rome.

The Last Supper was depicted both in the Eastern and Western Churches. By the Renaissance, it was a favorite subject in Italian art. It was also one of the few subjects to be continued in Lutheran altarpieces for a few decades after the Protestant Reformation.

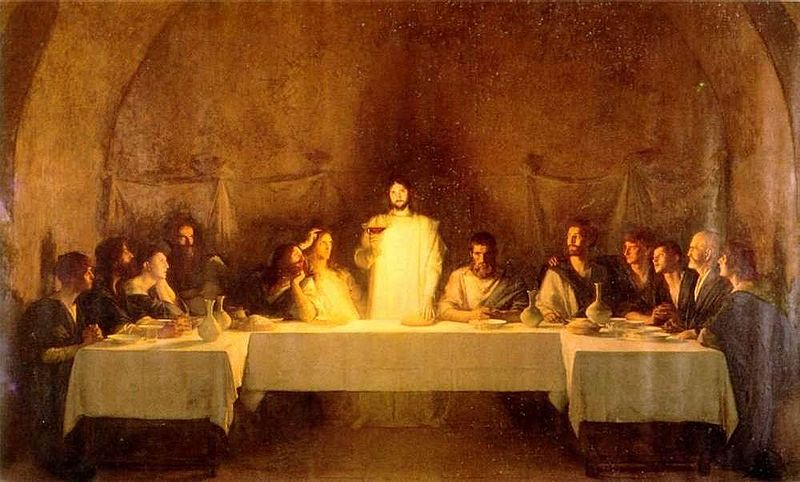
Last Supper, by Dagnan-Bouveret, 1896

There are two major scenes shown in depictions of the Last Supper: the dramatic announcement of the betrayal of Jesus, and the institution of the Eucharist. After the meal the further scenes of Jesus washing the feet of his apostles and the Farewell Discourse (farewell of Jesus to his disciples) are also sometimes depicted.

== Setting ==
The earliest known written reference to the Last Supper is in Paul's First Epistle to the Corinthians (11:23–26), which dates to the middle of the first century, between AD 54–55. The Last Supper was likely a retelling of the events of the last meal of Jesus among the early Christian community, and became a ritual which referred to that meal. The earliest depictions of such meals occur in the frescoes of the Catacomb of Rome, where figures are depicted reclining around semi-circular tables. In spite of near unanimous assent on the historicity of the evidence, one scholar comments that "The motif of the Last supper appears neither among the paintings of the catacombs nor the sculptures on sarcophagi ... The few frescos in the catacombs representing a meal in which Christ and some of the disciples participate show not the Last supper but refer to the future meal promised by the exalted Christ in his heavenly kingdom", seeing the subject’s depiction as beginning in the 6th century.

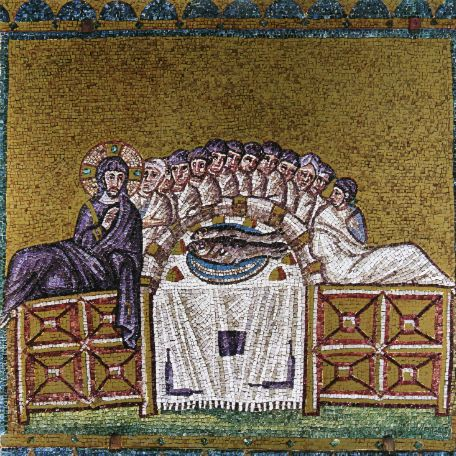
6th century Mosaic of the Last Supper in Sant' Apollinare Nuovo, Ravenna

A clearer case is the mosaic in the Basilica of Sant' Apollinare Nuovo in Ravenna, Italy, where a similar meal scene is part of a cycle depicting the life of Jesus and involves clear representation of him and his disciples. Byzantine artists sometimes used semi-circular tables in their depictions, but they focused on the Communion of the Apostles more frequently than on the reclining figures having a meal. The Last Supper was also one of the few subjects to be continued in Lutheran altarpieces for a few decades after the Protestant Reformation, sometimes showing portraits of leading Protestant theologians as the apostles.

By the Renaissance, the Last Supper was a popular subject in Italian art, especially in the refectories of monasteries. These depictions typically portrayed the reactions of the disciples to the announcement of the betrayal of Jesus. Most of the Italian depictions use an oblong table, rather than a semi-circular one, and Judas is sometimes shown by himself, clutching his money bag.

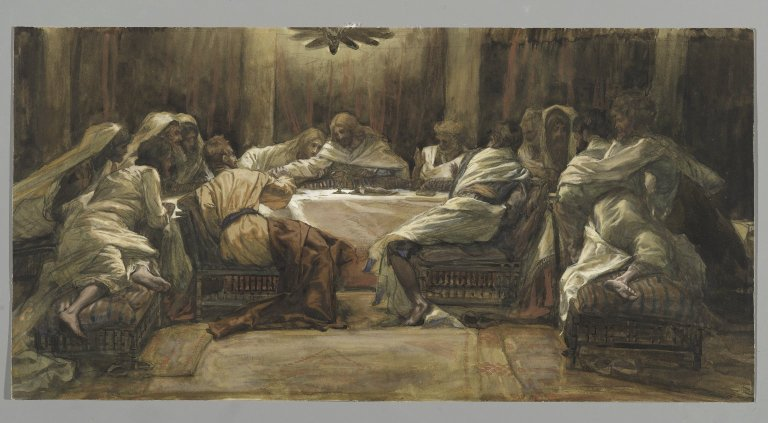
Last Supper by James Tissot, between 1886 and 1894. Tissot shows the Apostles as they most probably ate the meal: on couches, which was the custom of the time.

With an oblong table, the artist had to decide whether to show the apostles on both sides, with some seen from behind, or all on one side of the table facing the viewer. Sometimes only Judas is on the side nearest the viewer, allowing the bag to be seen. The placement on both sides was further complicated when halos were obligatory: was the halo to be placed as though in front of the rear-facing apostles’ faces or as though fixed to the back of their heads, obscuring the view? Duccio, daringly for the time, omits the halos of the apostles nearest the viewer. As artists became increasingly interested in realism and the depiction of space, a three-sided interior setting became more clearly shown and elaborate, sometimes with a landscape view behind, as in the wall-paintings by Leonardo da Vinci and Perugino. Artists who showed the scene on a ceiling or in a relief sculpture had further difficulties in devising a composition.

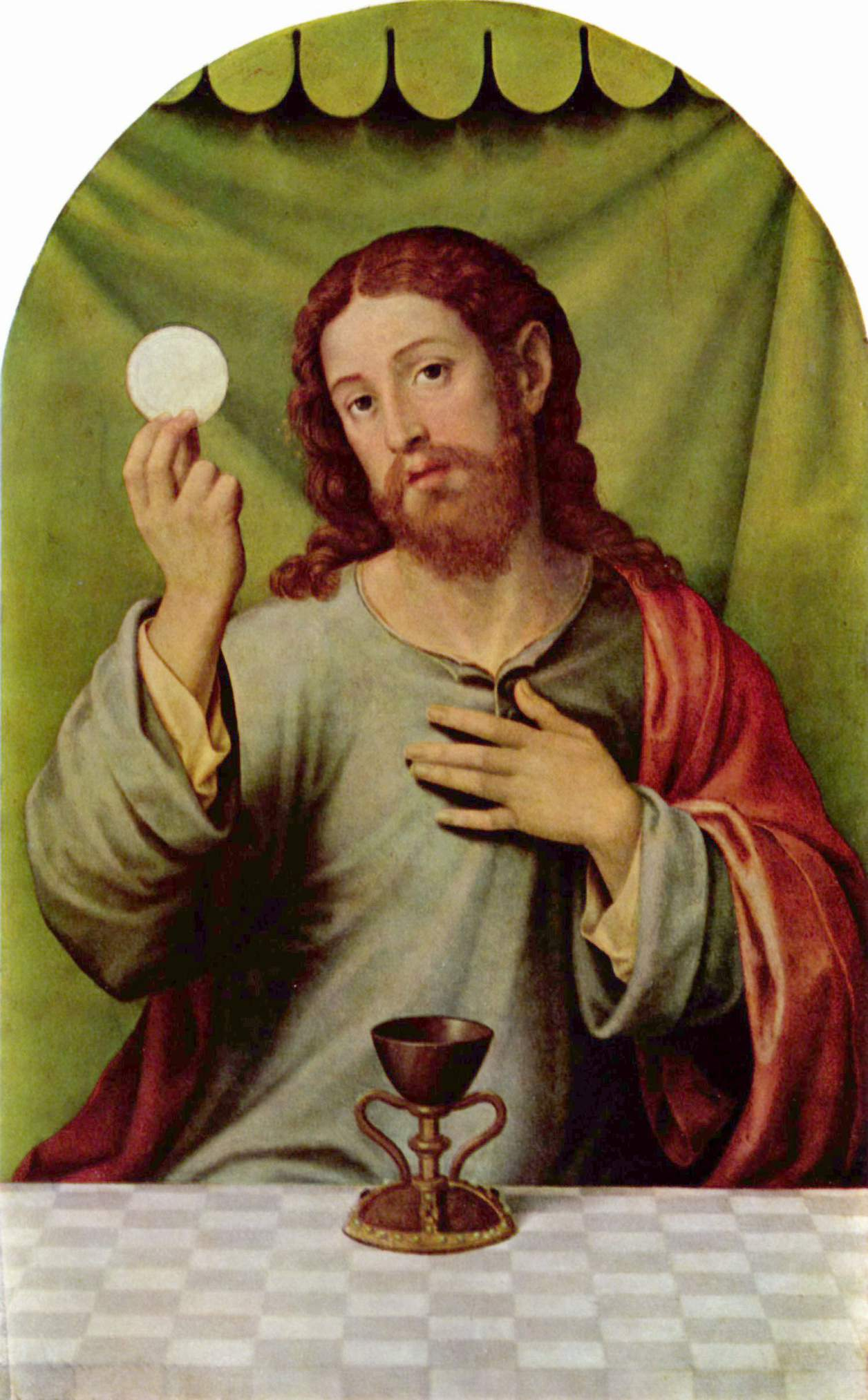
Jesus with the Eucharist (detail), by Juan de Juanes, mid-late 16th century

Typically, the only apostles easily identifiable are Judas Iscariot, often with his bag containing thirty pieces of silver visible, John the Evangelist, normally placed on Jesus's right side, usually "reclining in Jesus' bosom" as his Gospel says (see below), or even asleep, and Saint Peter on Jesus's left. The food on the table often includes a paschal lamb; in Late Antique and Byzantine versions fish was the main dish. In later works the bread may become more like a communion host, and more food, eating, and figures of servers appear.

== Major scenes ==
There are two major episodes or moments depicted in Last Supper scenes, each with specific variants. There are also other, less frequently depicted scenes, such as the washing of the feet of the disciples.

=== The Betrayal ===
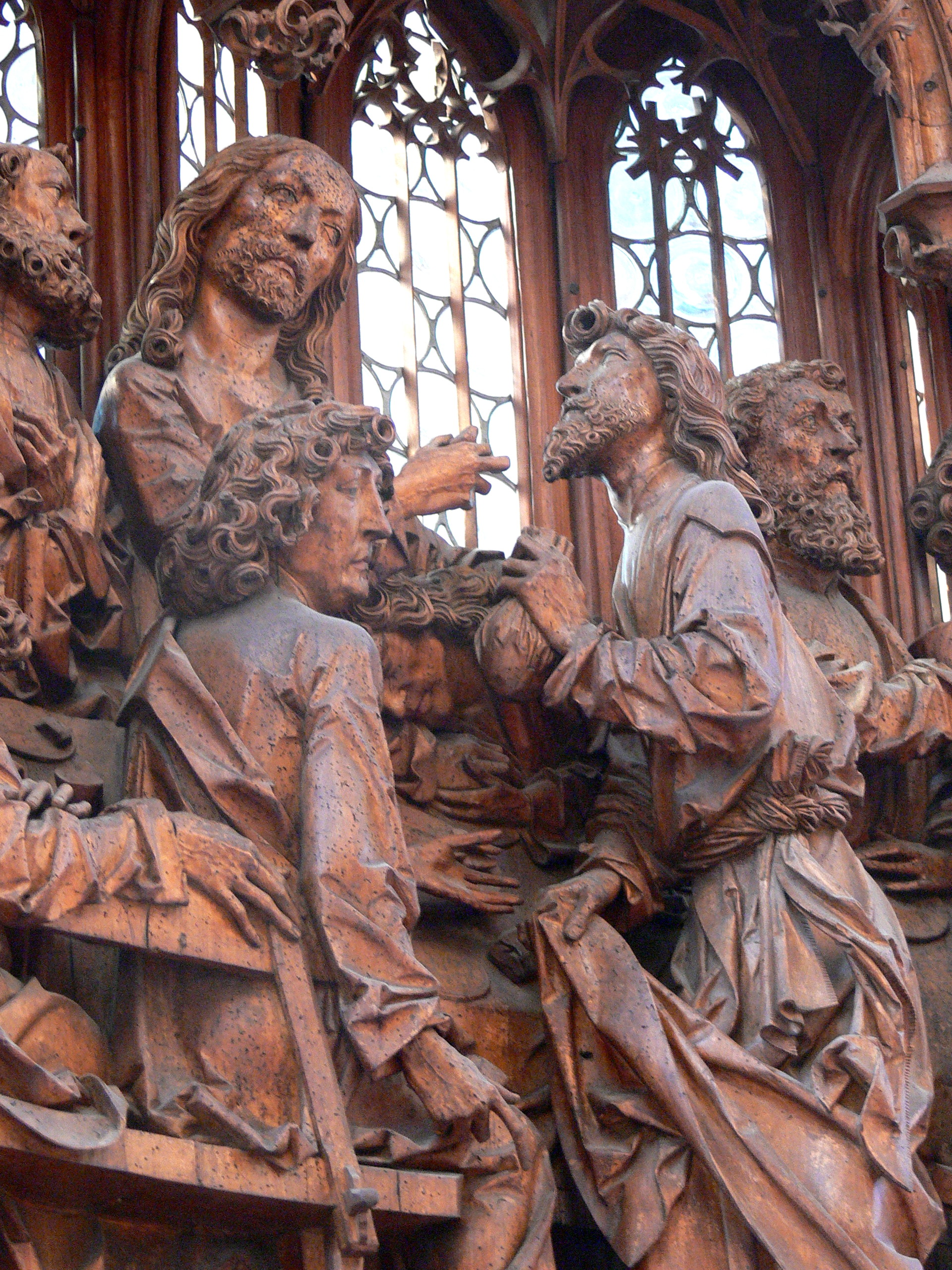
Jesus hands Judas the sop, Tilman Riemenschneider, Holy Blood Altar, Rothenburg ob der Tauber, 1501–05.

The first episode, much the most common in Western Medieval art, is the dramatic and dynamic moment of Jesus' announcement of his betrayal. In this the various reactions produced by the Apostles and the depictions of their emotions provide a rich subject for artistic exploration, following the text of Chapter 13 of the Gospel of John (21–29, a "sop" is a piece of bread dipped in sauce or wine):

21 When Jesus had thus said, he was troubled in the spirit, and testified, and said, Verily, verily, I say unto you, that one of you shall betray me.

22 The disciples looked one on another, doubting of whom he spake.

23 There was at the table reclining in Jesus' bosom one of his disciples, whom Jesus loved.

24 Simon Peter therefore beckoneth to him, and saith unto him, Tell [us] who it is of whom he speaketh.

25 He leaning back, as he was, on Jesus' breast saith unto him, Lord, who is it?

26 Jesus therefore answereth, He it is, for whom I shall dip the sop, and give it him. So when he had dipped the sop, he taketh and giveth it to Judas, [the son] of Simon Iscariot.

27 And after the sop, then entered Satan into him. Jesus therefore saith unto him, What thou doest, do quickly.

28 Now no man at the table knew for what intent he spake this unto him.

29 For some thought, because Judas had the bag, that Jesus said unto him, Buy what things we have need of for the feast; or, that he should give something to the poor.

30 He then having received the sop went out straightway: and it was night.

Especially in Eastern depictions, Judas may only be identifiable because he is stretching out his hand for the food, as the other apostles sit with hands out of sight, or because he lacks a halo. In the West he often has red hair. Sometimes Judas takes the sop in his mouth directly from Jesus' hand, and when he is shown eating it a small devil may be shown next to or on it. The betrayal scene may also be combined with the other episodes of the meal, sometimes with a second figure of Christ washing Peter's feet.

=== The Eucharist ===
The second scene shows the institution of the Eucharist, which may be shown as either the moment of the consecration of the bread and wine, with all still seated, or their distribution in the first Holy Communion, technically known in art history as the Communion of the Apostles (though in depictions set at the table the distinction is often not made), which is common in very early depictions and throughout Byzantine art, and in the West reappears from the 14th century onwards. The depictions of both scenes are generally solemn and mystical; in the latter Jesus may be standing and delivers the communion bread and wine to each apostle, like a priest giving the sacrament of Holy Communion. In early and Eastern Orthodox depictions the apostles may queue up to receive it, as though in a church, with Jesus standing under or next to a ciborium, the small open structure over the altar, which was much more common in Early Medieval churches. An example of this type is in mosaic in the apse of the Saint Sophia Cathedral in Kyiv, under a very large standing Virgin.

Depictions of The Eucharist

The Main Altarpiece of the Corpus Christi Parish Church in Għasri, Malta

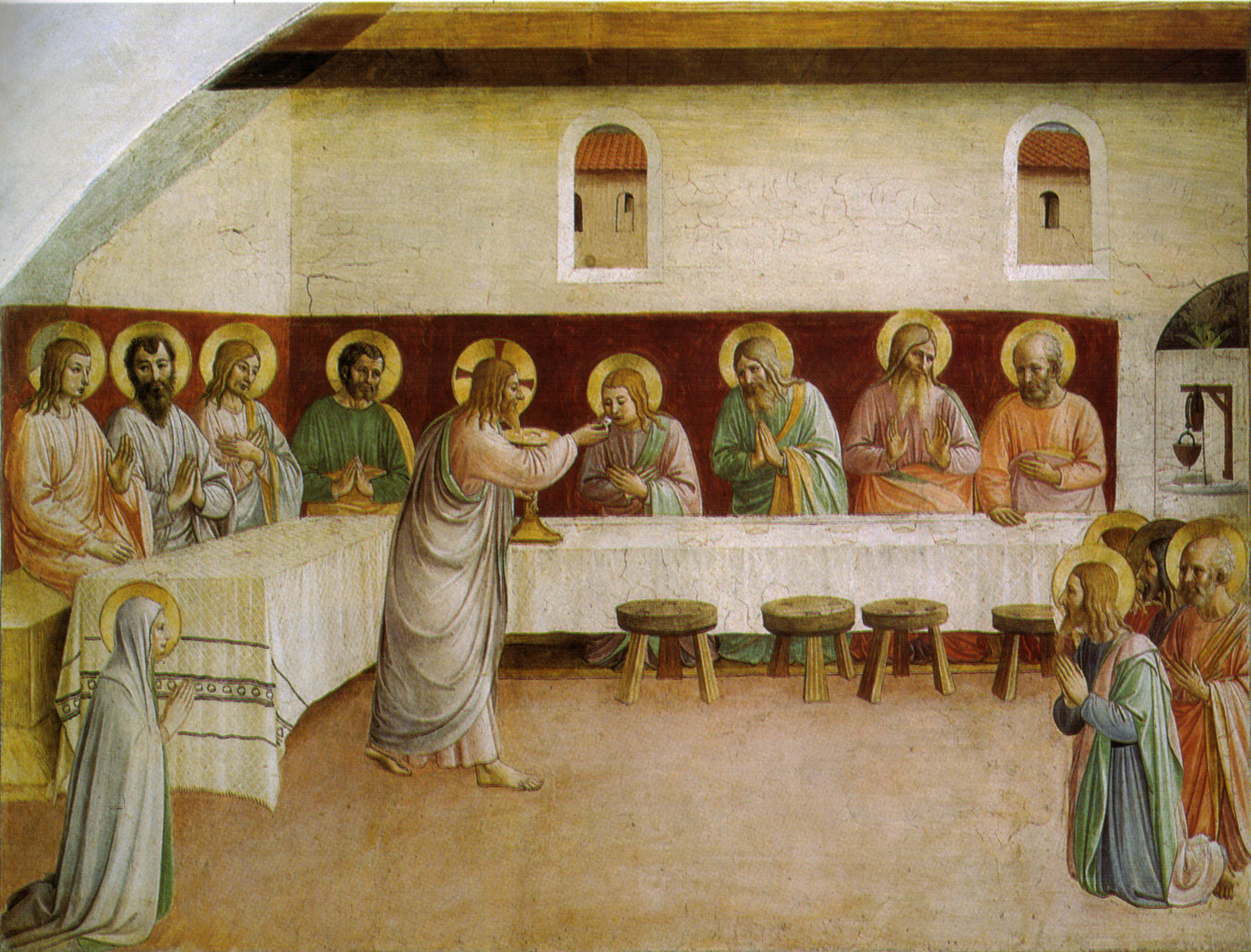
Communion of the Apostles, by Fra Angelico, with donor portrait, 1440–41

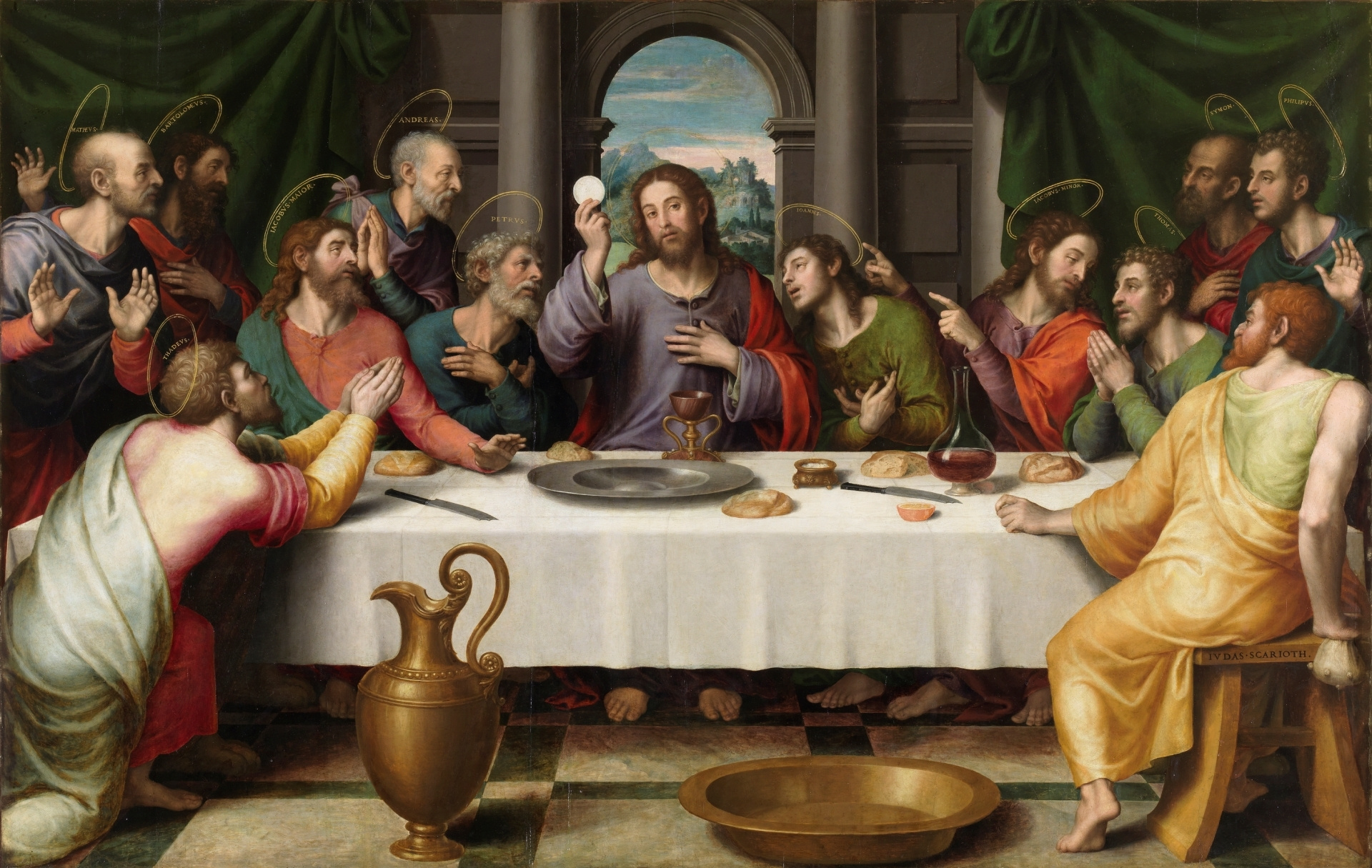
The first Eucharist, by Juan de Juanes, mid-late 16th century

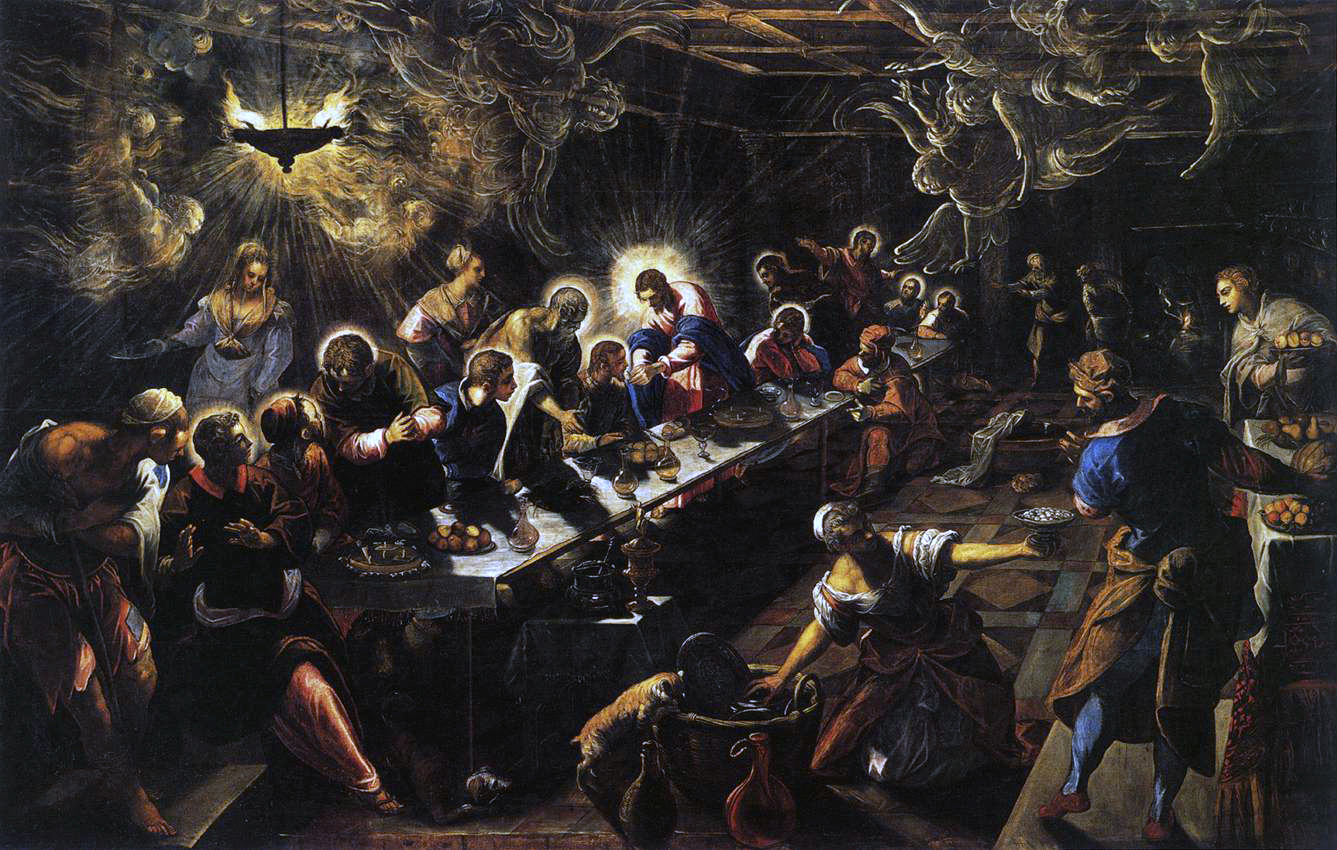
Tintoretto, Last Supper, 1592–94, showing the Communion of the Apostles

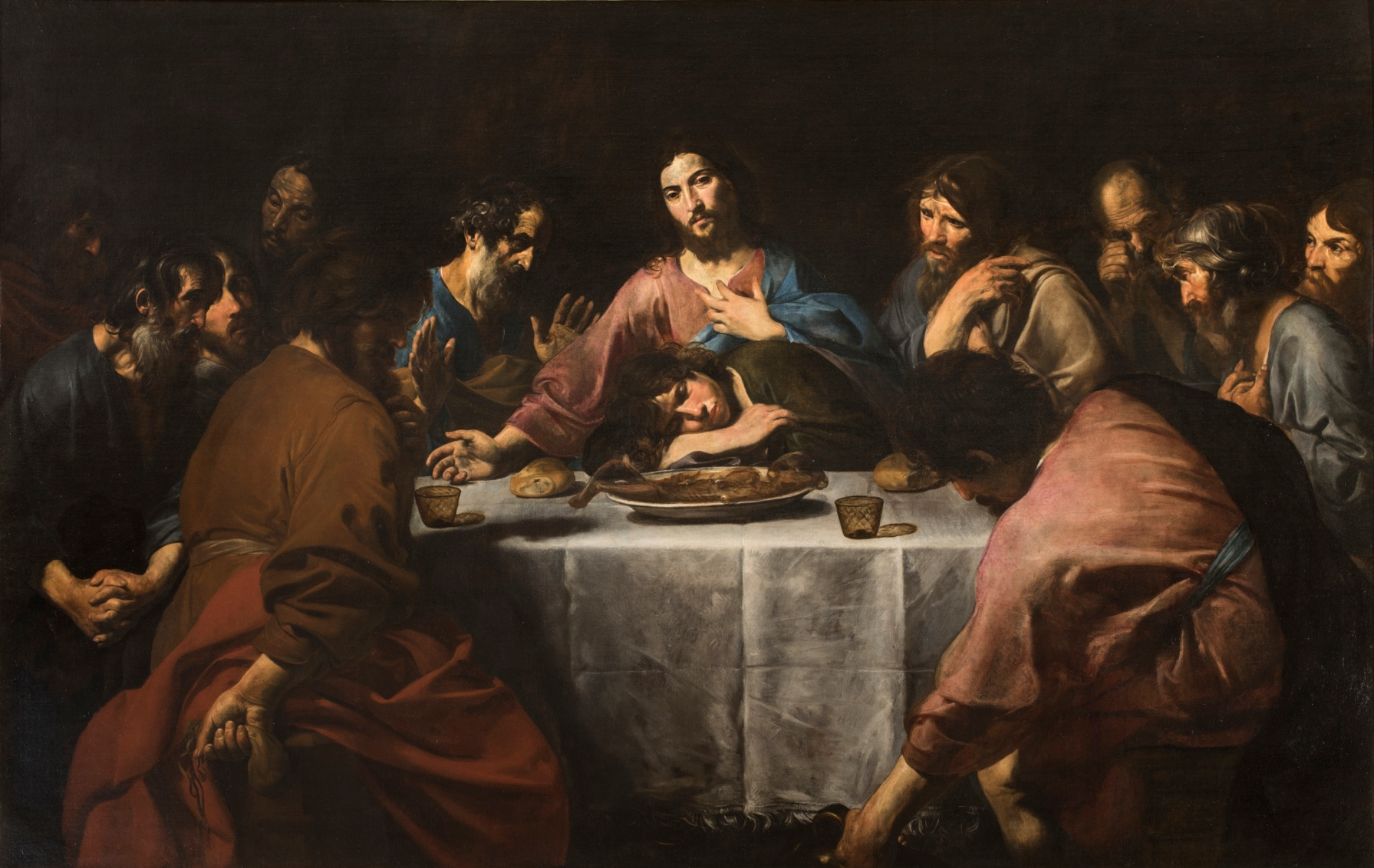
Valentin de Boulogne, 1625–26

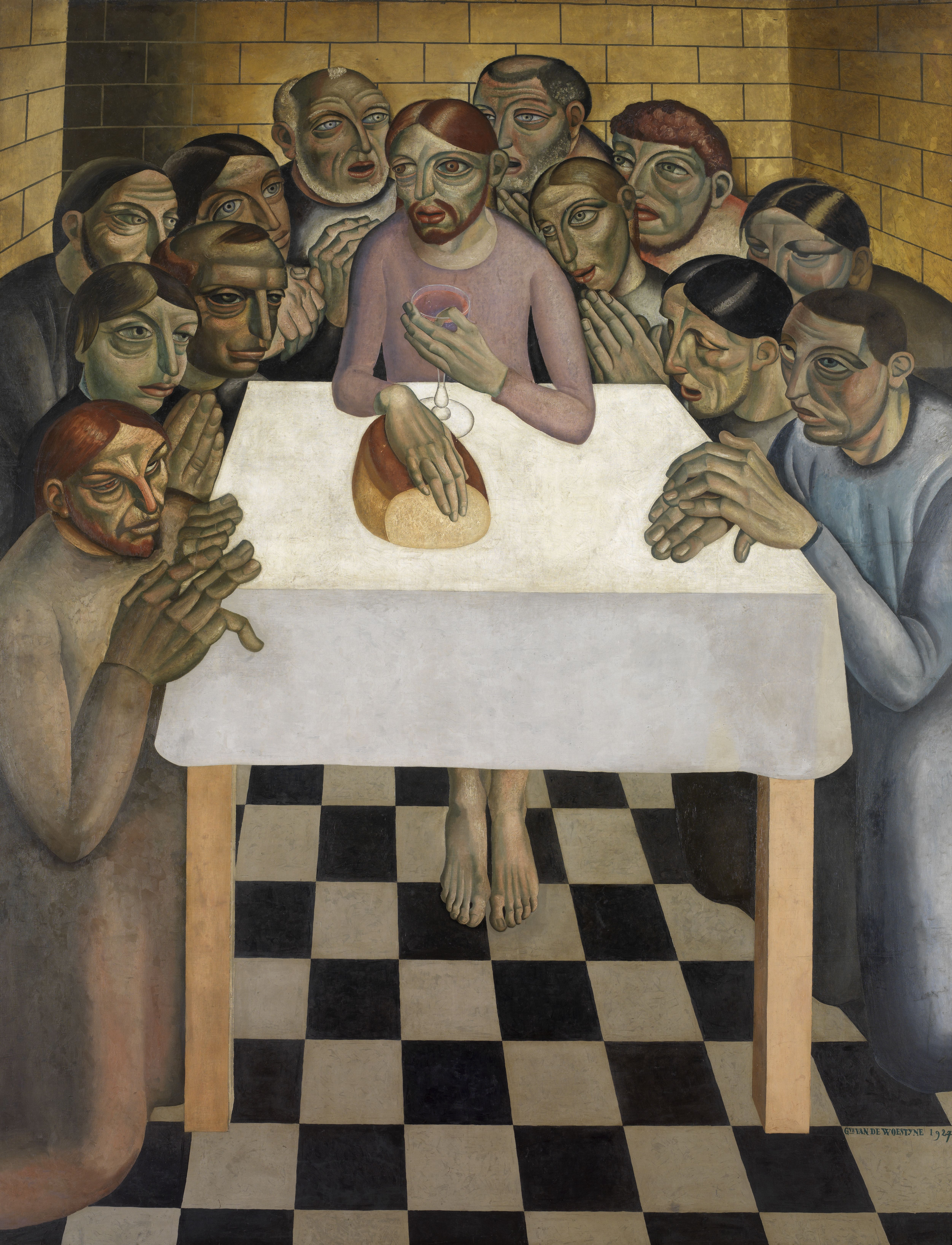
Gustave Van de Woestyne, 1927

=== Washing of feet and farewell ===
The washing of feet was an element of hospitality normally performed by servants or slaves, and a mark of great respect if performed by the host. It is recorded in John 13:1–15, as preceding the meal, and subsequently became a feature of the liturgy of the Holy Week and year-round monastic hospitality at various times and places, being regularly performed by the Byzantine emperors on Maundy Thursday for example, and at times being part of English Royal Maundy ceremonies performed by the monarch. For a while it formed part of the Baptism ceremony in some places. It mostly appears in cycles of the Passion of Jesus, often next to the Last Supper meal and given equal prominence, as in the 6th century St Augustine Gospels and 12th century Ingeborg Psalter, and also may appear in cycles of the Life of Saint Peter. Where space is limited only Jesus and Peter may be shown, and many scenes show the amazement of Peter, following John. A number of scenes appear on 4th century sarcophagi, in one case placed to correspond with a scene of Pontius Pilate washing his hands. Some types show Jesus standing as he is confronted by Peter; in others he is bending or kneeling to perform the washing. The subject had various theological interpretations which affected the composition, but gradually became less common in the West by the Late Middle Ages, though there are at least two large examples by Tintoretto, one originally paired with a Last Supper.

The last episode, far less commonly shown, is the Farewell Discourse, the farewell of Jesus to his disciples. By this point Judas Iscariot is no longer present, having left the supper; it is mostly found in Italian trecento painting. The depictions here are generally melancholy, as Jesus prepares his disciples for his departure.

Depictions of Washing of feet and farewell

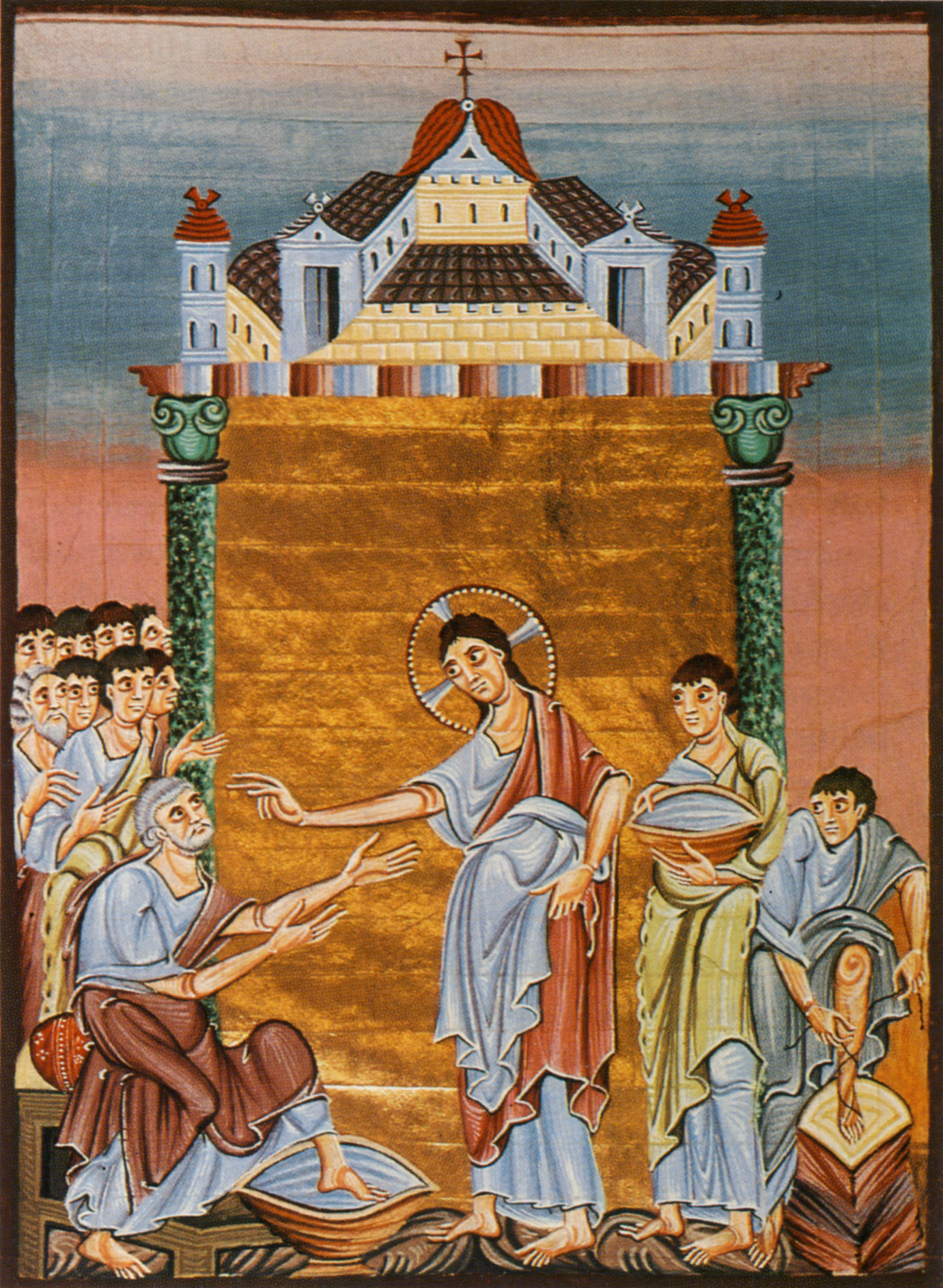
Christ washing the Apostles' feet in the Gospels of Otto III, 10th–11th century

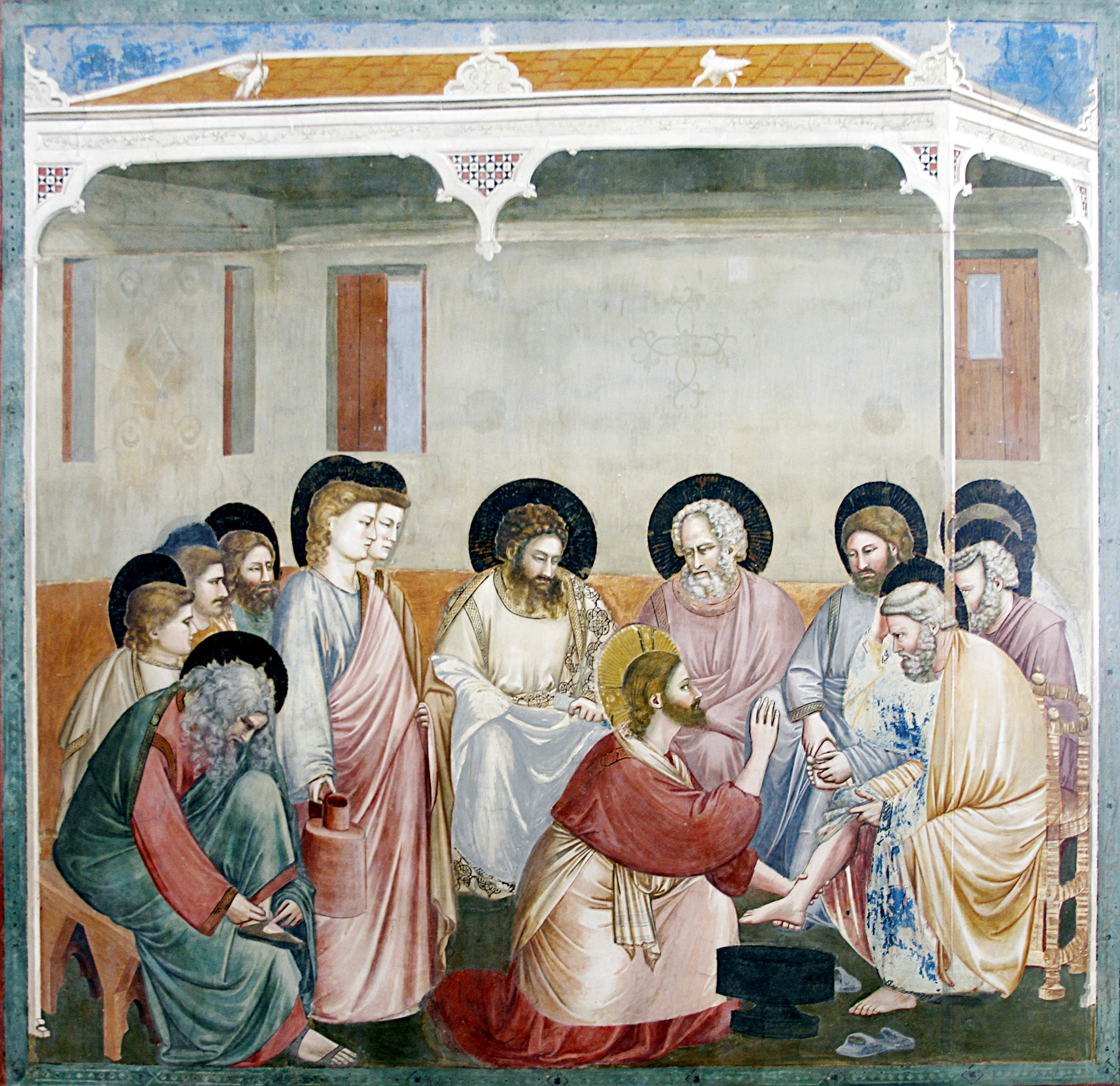
Christ Reasoning with Peter as he washes his feet, by Giotto di Bondone (Scrovegni Chapel), c. 1304–06

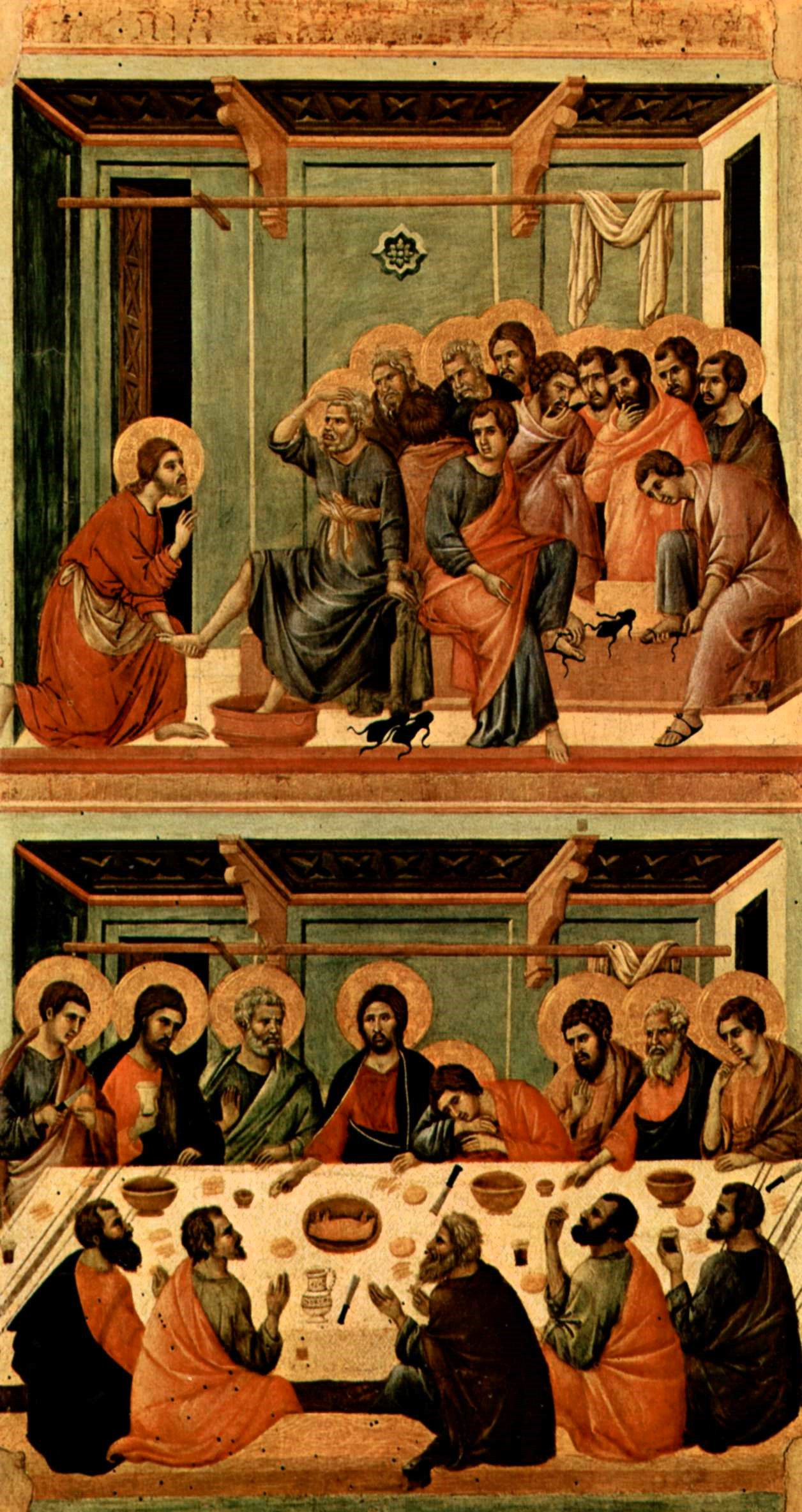
Last Supper and Washing of Feet, Maestà by Duccio, 1308–11

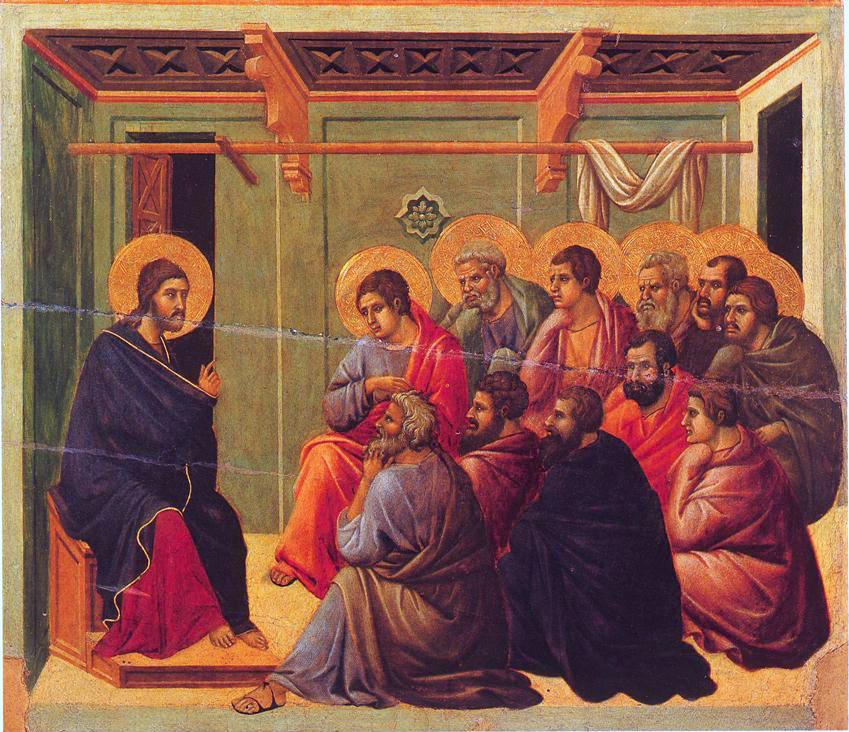
Jesus "saying farewell", Maestà by Duccio, 1308–11

== Key examples ==
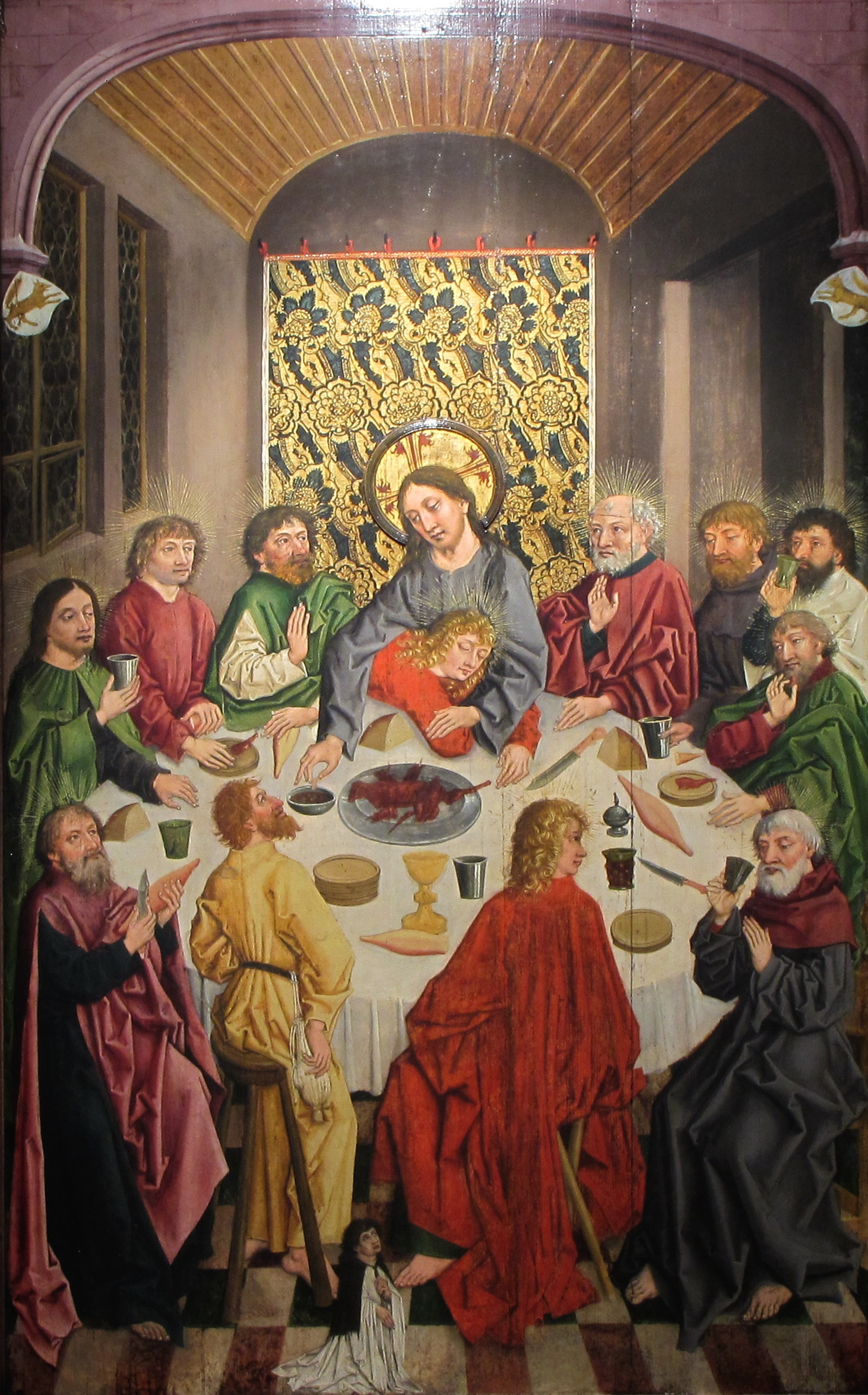
The Passion of Christ, circa 1485−1490 (Old Saint Peter's Church, Strasbourg). John the Evangelist leans across, and Judas Iscariot in yellow carries his thirty pieces of silver in a bag. The small figure below represents the painting's donator.

Pietro Perugino's depiction (c. 1490) in Florence shows Judas sitting separately, and is considered one of Perugino's best pieces. It is located in the convent that housed noble Florentine girls. Upon its rediscovery, it was initially attributed to Raphael.

Leonardo da Vinci's depiction (late 1490s) is considered the first work of High Renaissance art due to its high level of harmony. Leonardo balanced the varying emotions of the individual apostles when Jesus stated that one of them would betray him, and portrayed the various attributes of anger, surprise and shock. It is likely that Leonardo da Vinci was already familiar with Ghirlandaio's Last Supper, as well as that of Castagno, and painted his own Last Supper in a more dramatic form to contrast with the stillness of these works, so that more emotion would be displayed.

Tintoretto's depiction (1590–1592) at the Basilica di San Giorgio Maggiore in Venice, also depicts the announcement of the betrayal, and includes secondary characters carrying or taking the dishes from the table.

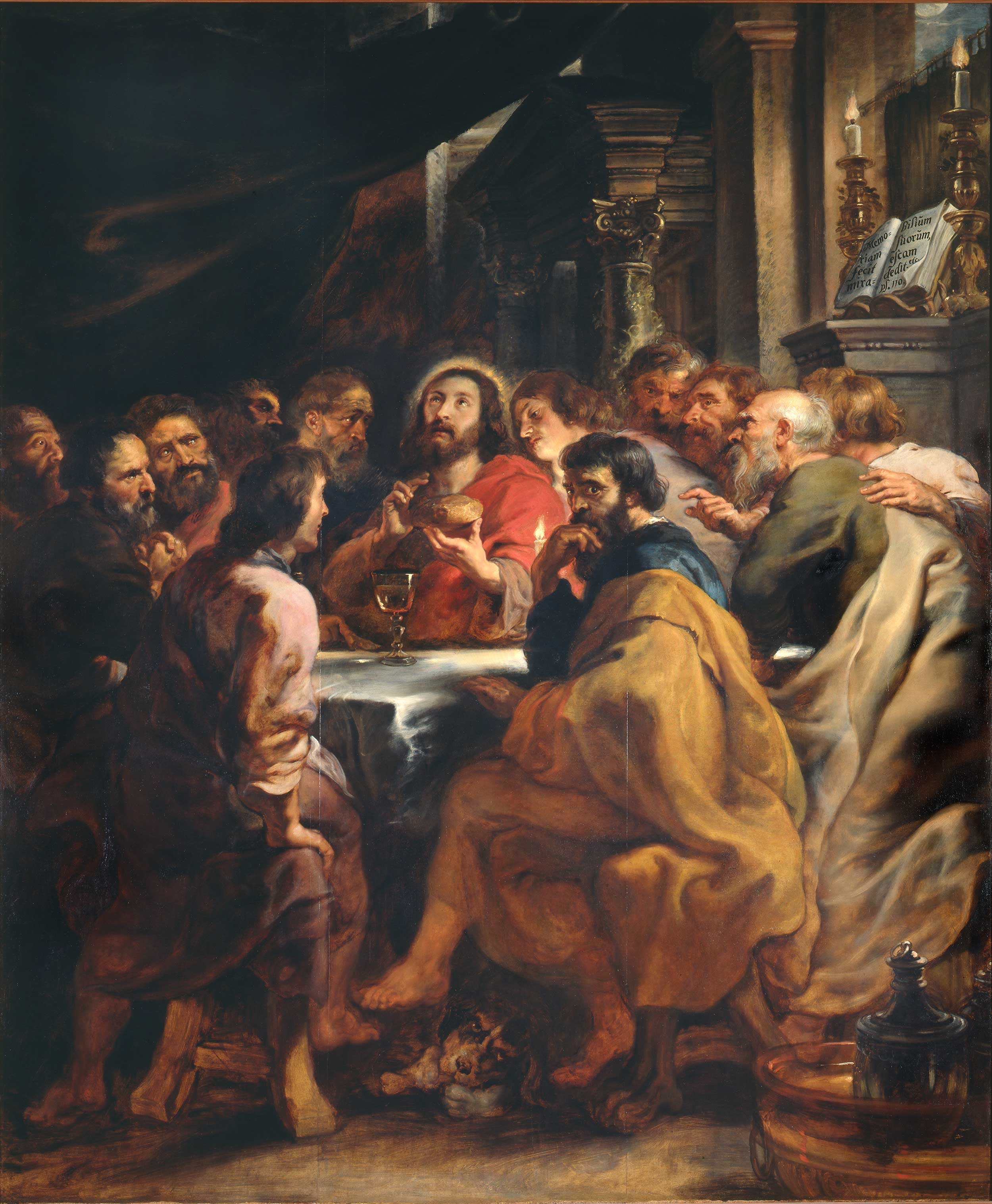
Peter Paul Rubens, Last Supper, 1630–31

There are far more numerous secondary figures in the huge painting now called The Feast in the House of Levi by Veronese. This was delivered in 1573 as a Last Supper to the Dominicans of Santi Giovanni e Paolo, Venice for their refectory, but Veronese was called before the Inquisition to explain why it contained "buffoons, drunken Germans, dwarfs and other such scurrilities" as well as extravagant costumes and settings, in what is indeed a fantasy version of a Venetian patrician feast. Veronese was told that he must change his painting within a three-month period - in fact he simply changed the title to the present one, still an episode from the Gospels, but a less doctrinally central one, and no more was said.

The Wittenberg Altarpiece of the main church in Martin Luther's home of Wittenberg is by Lucas Cranach the Elder (with his son and workshop), with a traditional representation of the Last Supper in the main panel, except that the apostle having a drink poured is a portrait of Luther, and the server may be one of Cranach. By the time the painting was installed in 1547, Luther was dead. Other panels show the Protestant theologians Philipp Melanchthon and Johannes Bugenhagen, pastor of the church, though not in biblical scenes. Other figures in the panels are probably portraits of figures from the town, now unidentifiable. Another work, the Altarpiece of the Reformers in Dessau, by Lucas Cranach the Younger (1565, see gallery) shows all the apostles except Judas as Protestant churchmen or nobility, and it is now the younger Cranach shown as the cupbearer. However such works are rare, and Protestant paintings soon reverted to more traditional depictions.

In Rubens' Last Supper, a dog with a bone can be seen in the scene. While probably a simple pet, it may represent faith (dogs are traditionally symbols of faith). According to J. Richard Judson, since the dog is near Judas, it may represent greed or evil as the companion of Judas, as in John 13:27.

The Sacrament of the Last Supper, Salvador Dalí's depiction, combines the typical Christian themes with modern approaches of Surrealism and also includes geometric elements of symmetry and polygonal proportion.

== Gallery ==
Depictions of The Last Supper in Christian art

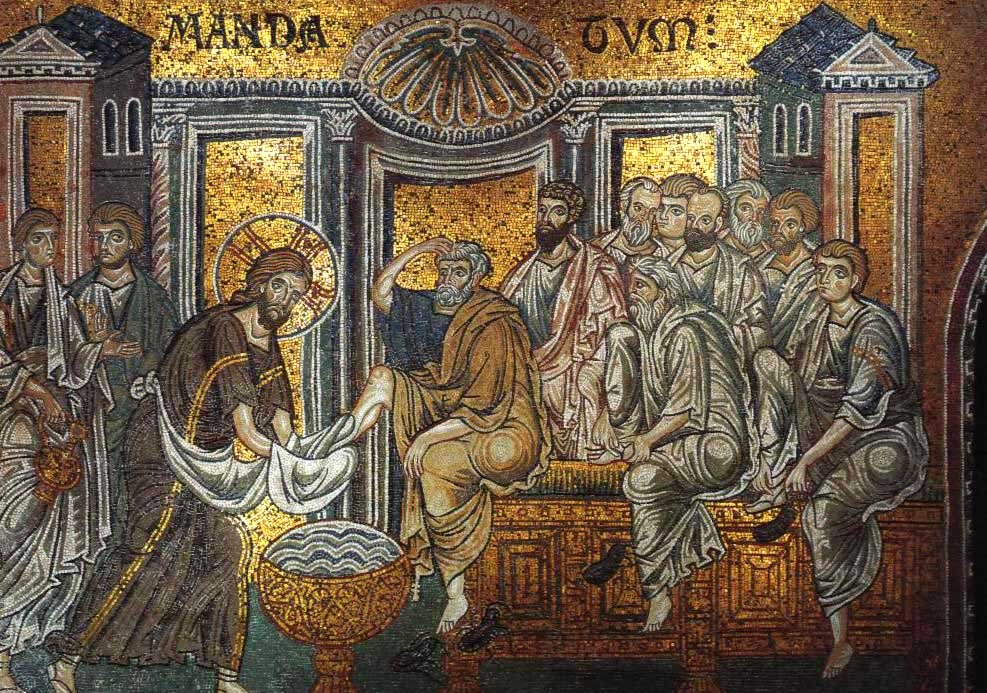
Byzantine mosaic of washing the disciples' feet, at the Monreale Cathedral, Italy

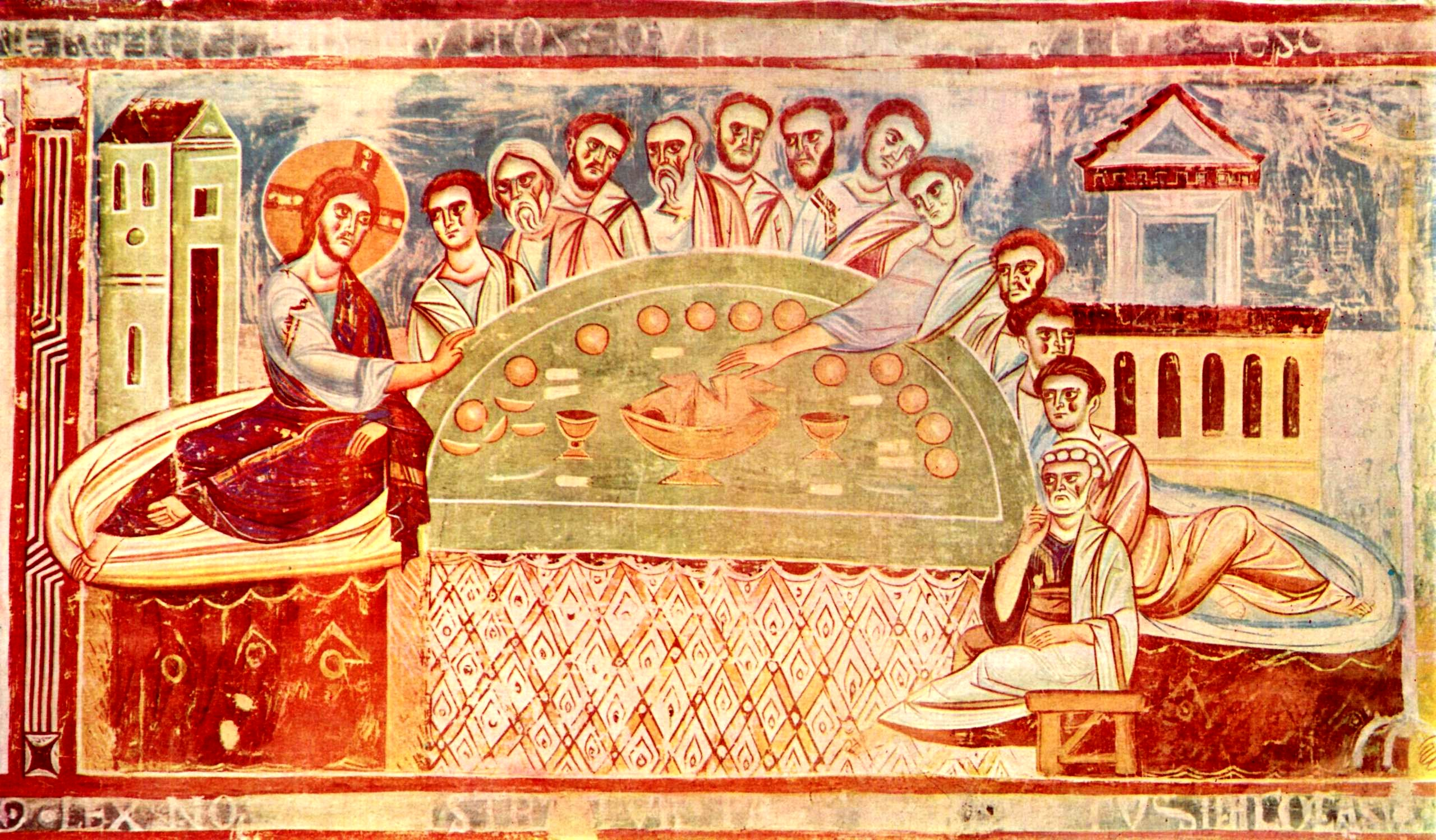
Judas reaches for the food; School of Monte Cassino, c. 1100, Sant'Angelo in Formis, Capua, still using Roman couches.

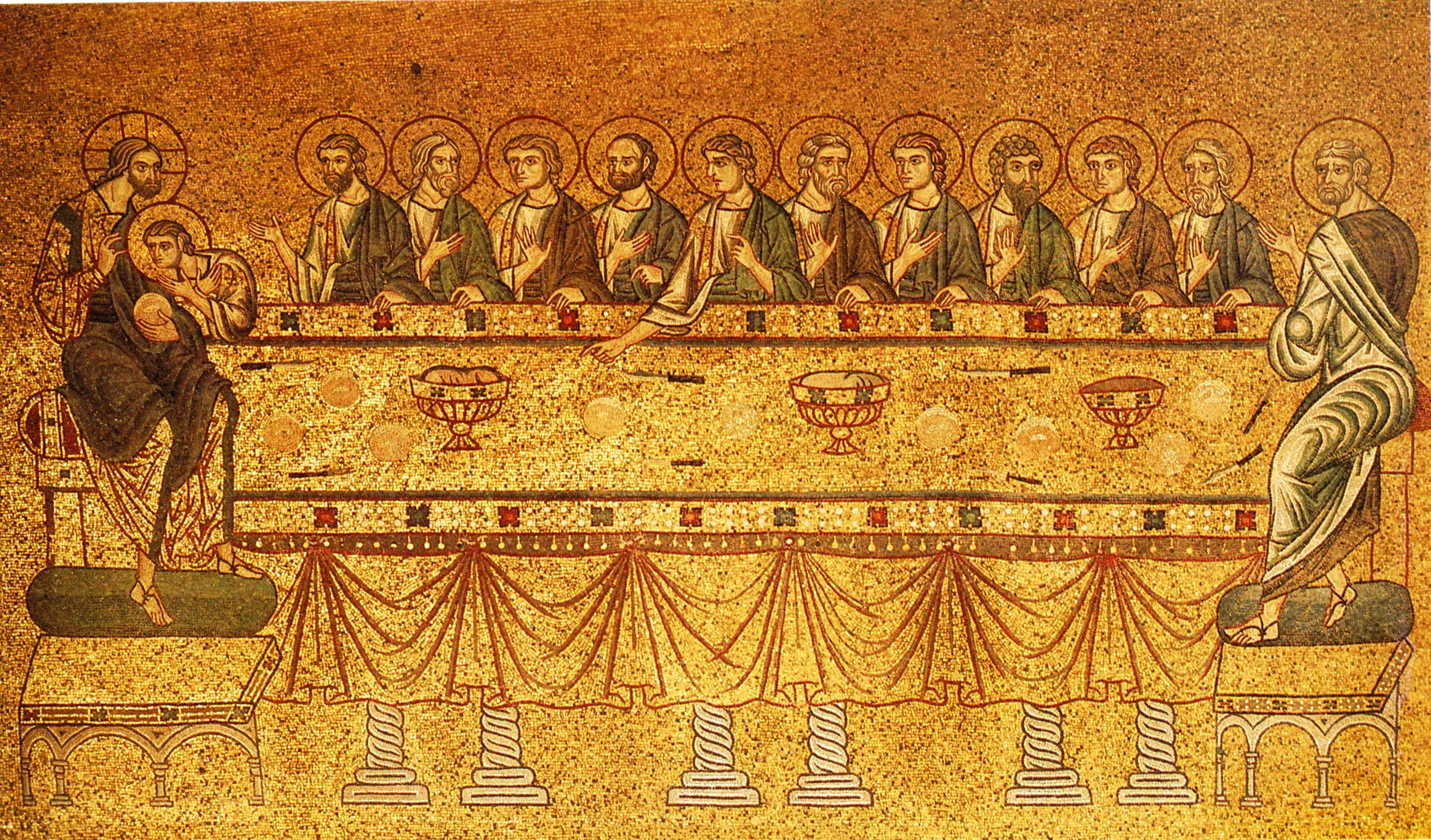
Saint Mark's Basilica, Venice, 13th century, Judas reaching out

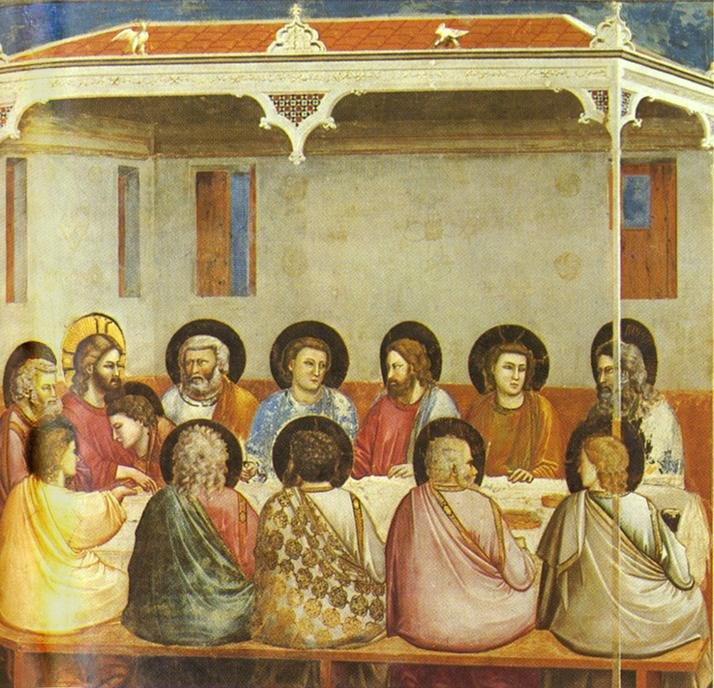
Giotto, Scrovegni Chapel, 1305, with flat perspectival haloes; the view from behind causes difficulties, and John's halo has to be reduced in size.

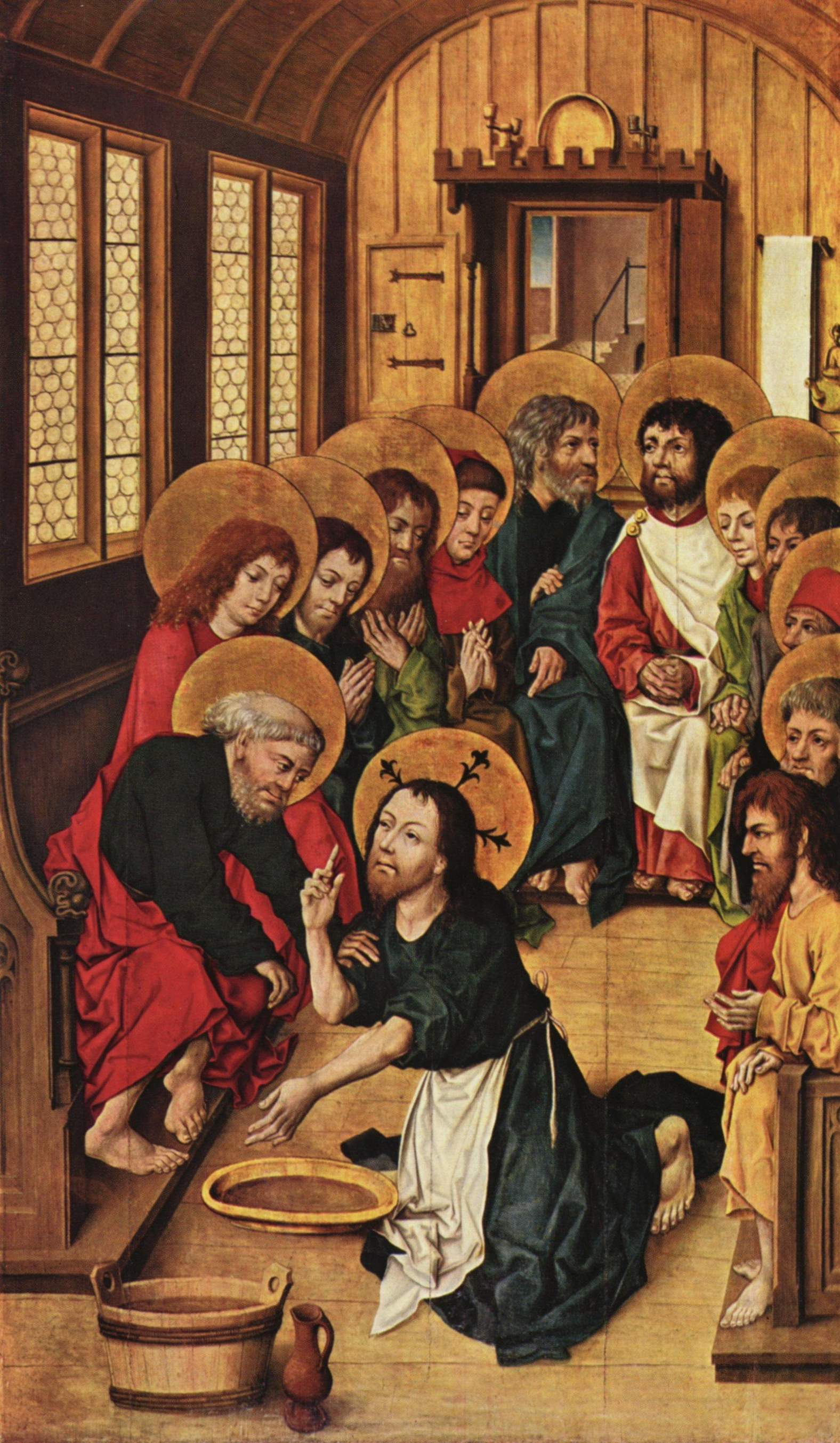
Christ Washing the Feet of the Apostles by Meister des Hausbuches, 1475; only Judas (near right) lacks a halo.

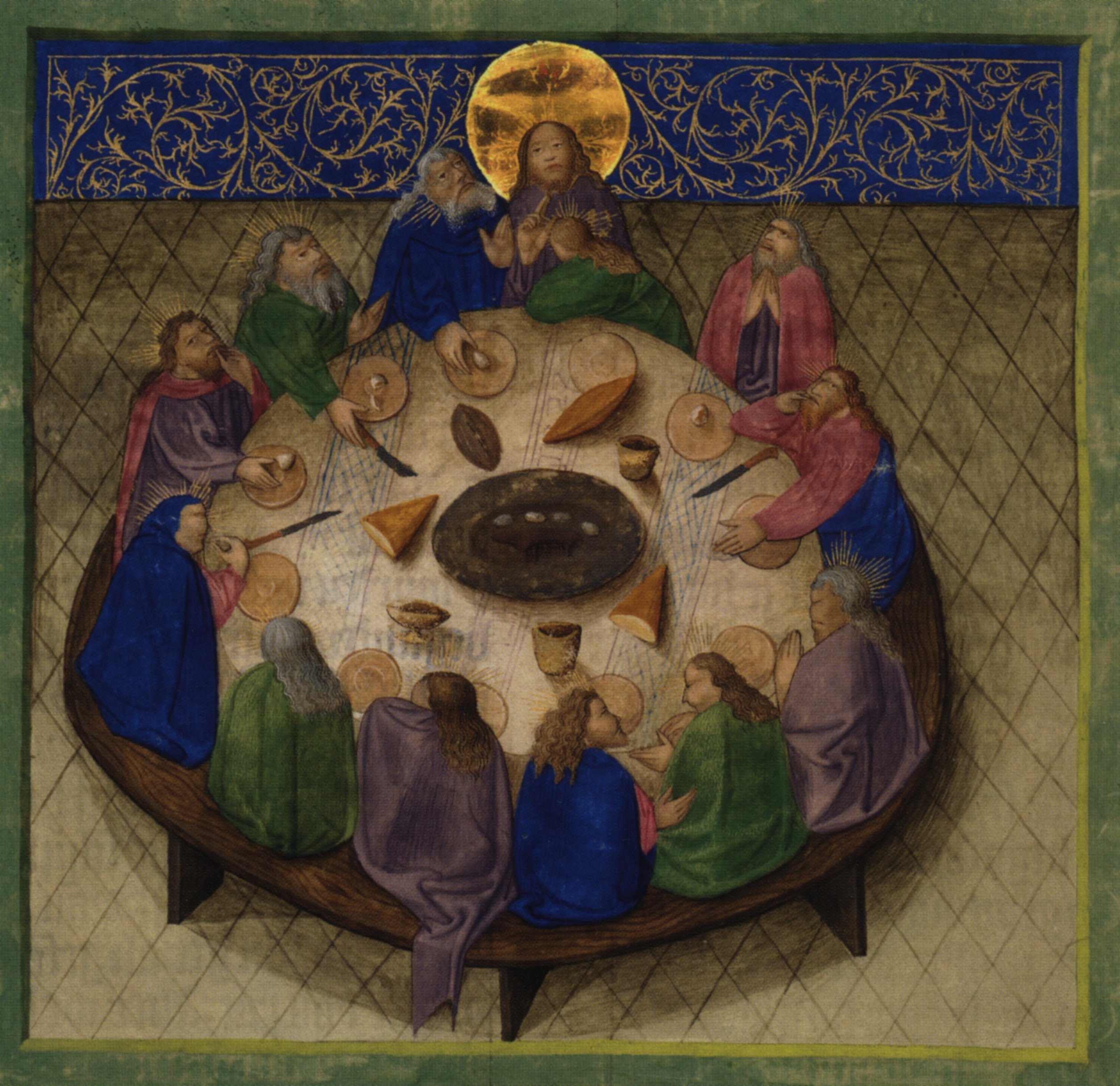
Ottheinrich Folio, p. 40v: Last Supper, Mt 26:20–29

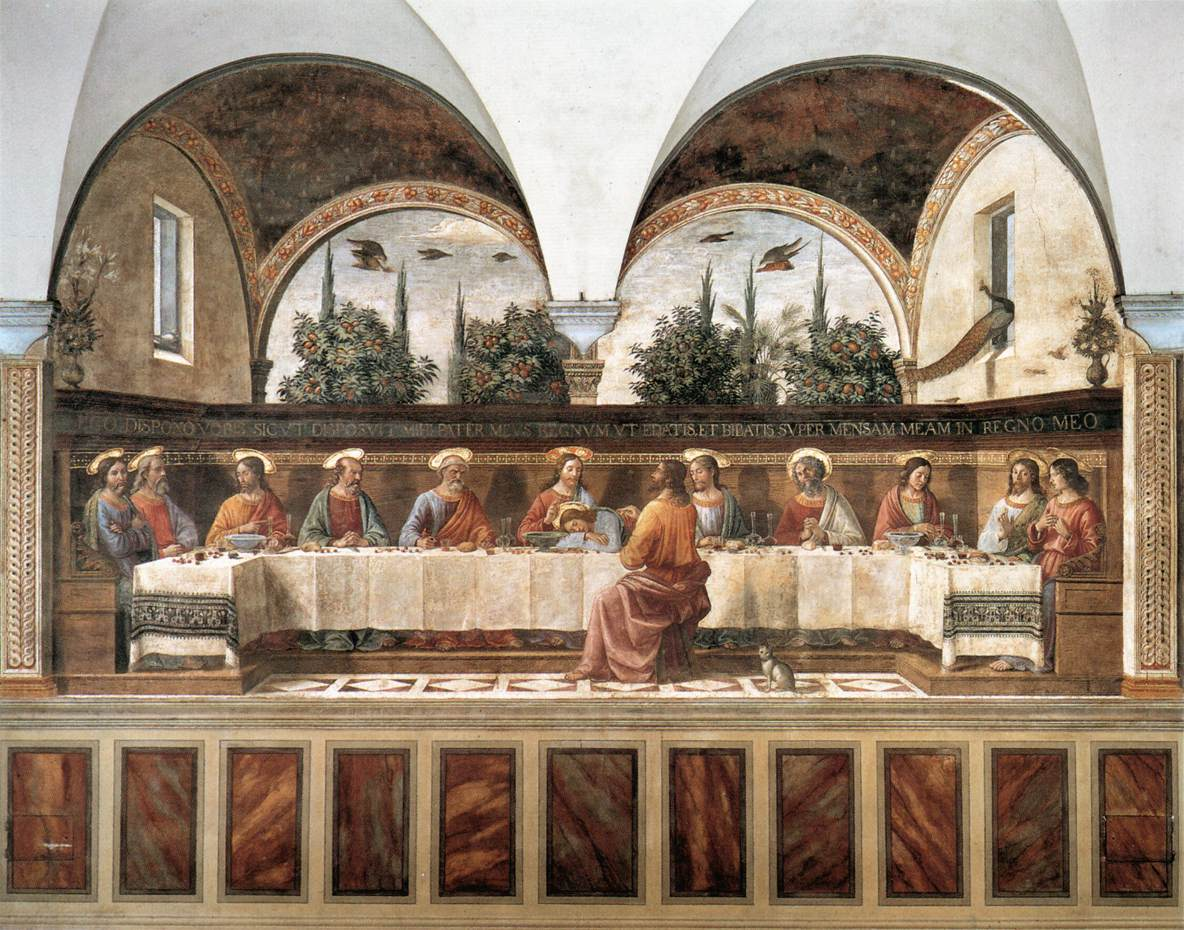
Last Supper by Domenico Ghirlandaio, 1480, depicting Judas separately

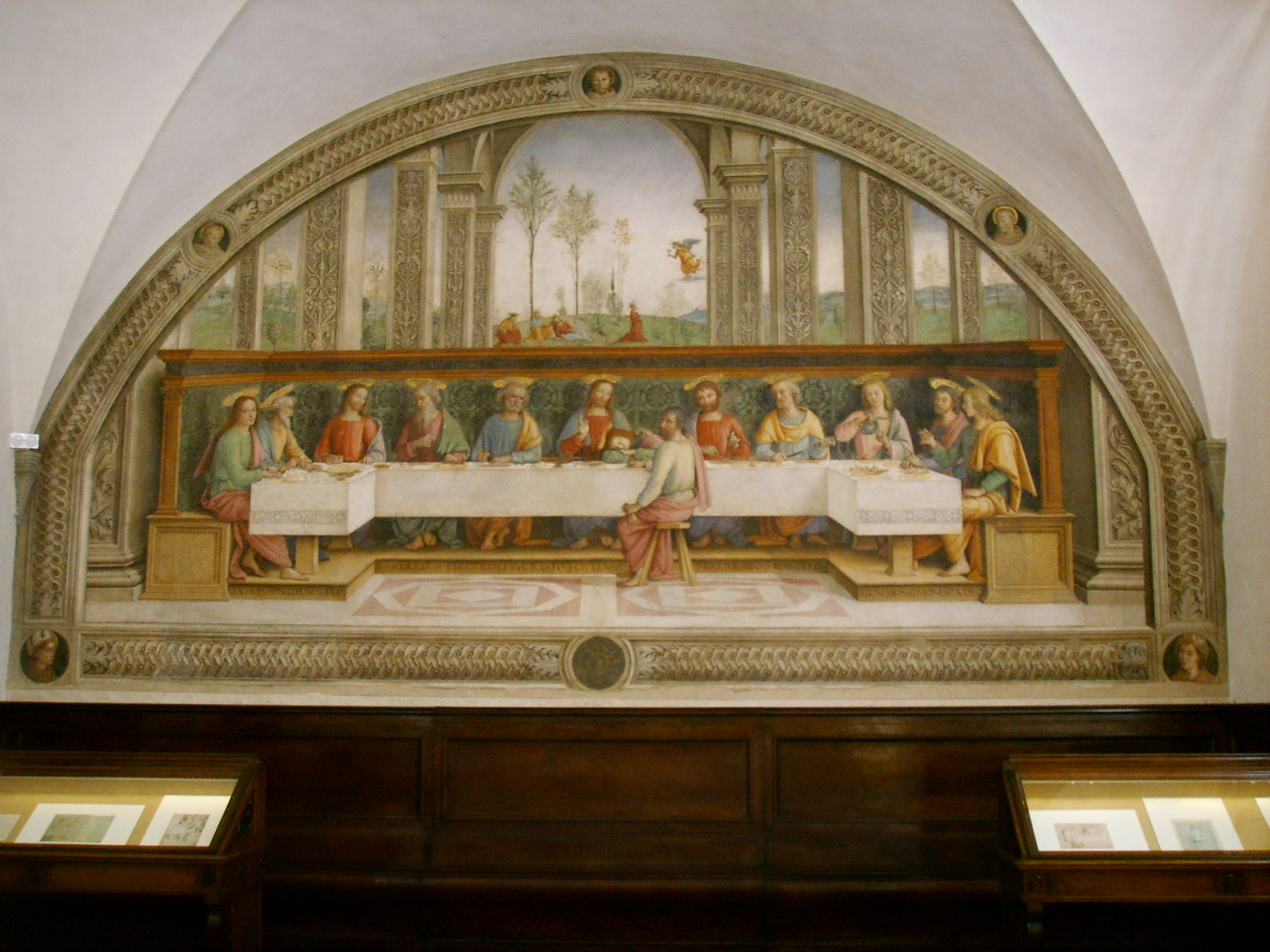
Last Supper by Pietro Perugino, depicting Judas separately, 1493–1496

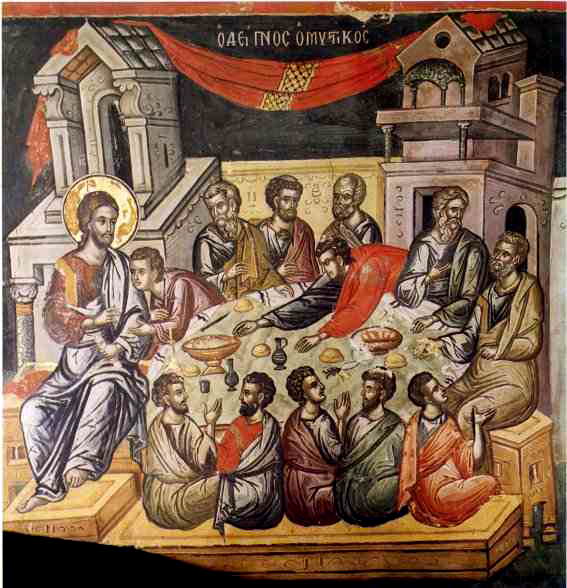
Judas reaches for the food; Theophanes the Cretan, 16th century

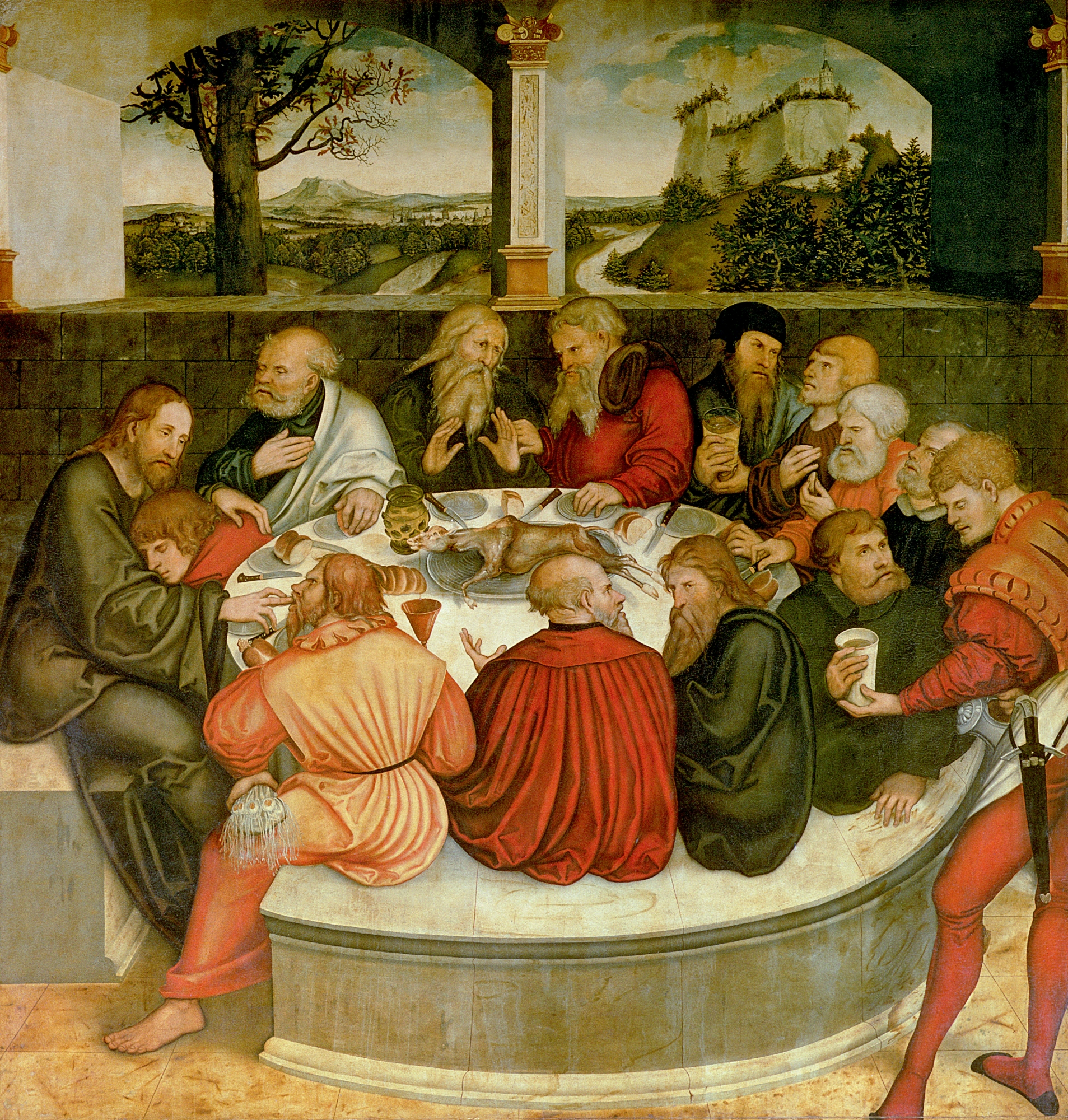
Protestant version by Lucas Cranach the Elder, 1547, central panel of altarpiece of St. Mary's Church, Wittenberg, Germany. 16th century

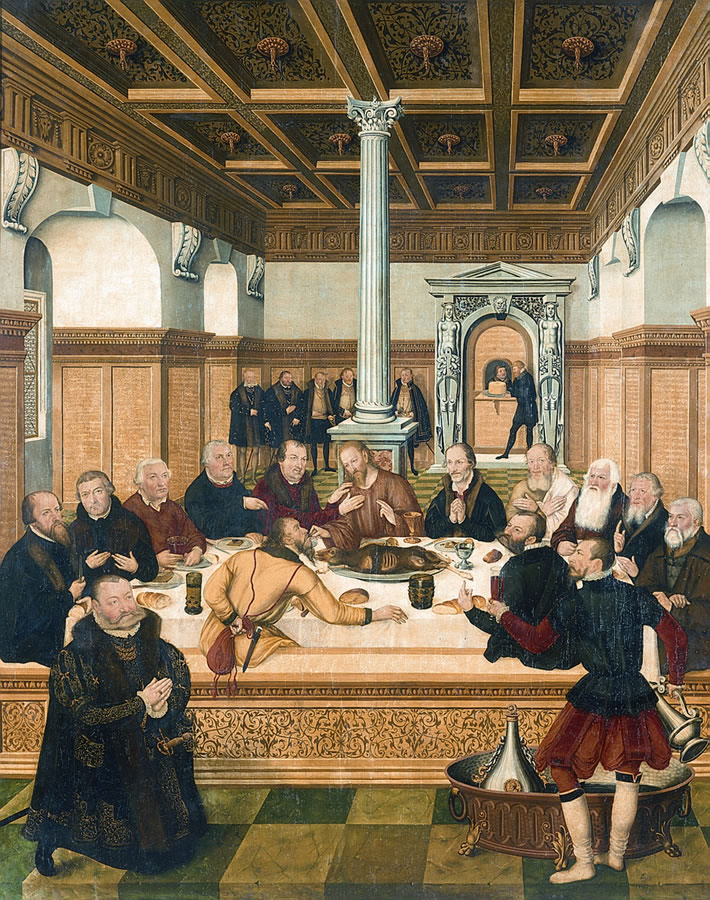
Protestant version by Lucas Cranach the Younger, 1565, with leading Reformers portrayed as the Apostles, and the Elector of Saxony kneeling

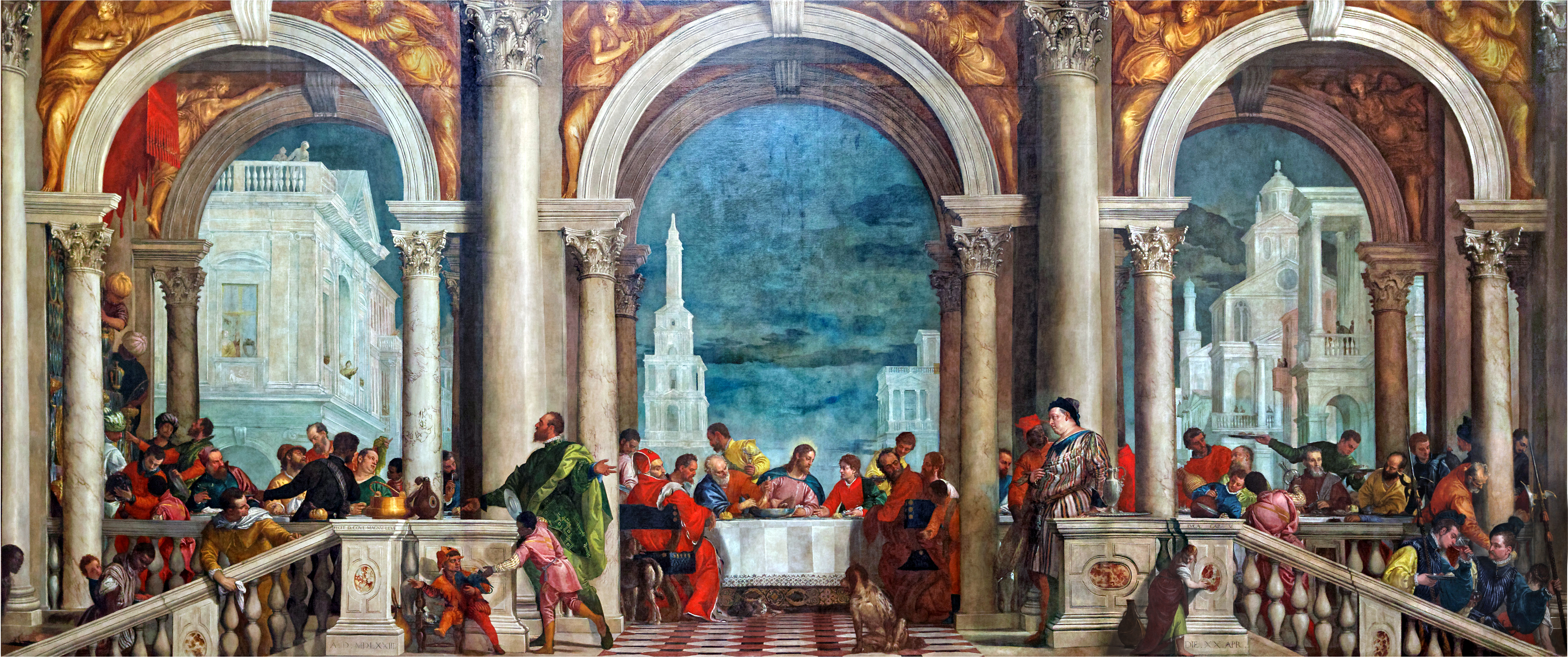
Paolo Veronese, now called The Feast in the House of Levi, 1573

== See also ==
- Ascension of Jesus in Christian art
- Christian art
- Art in Roman Catholicism
- The Reformation and art
