= Last Supper (Perugino) =

Fresco by Pietro Perugino

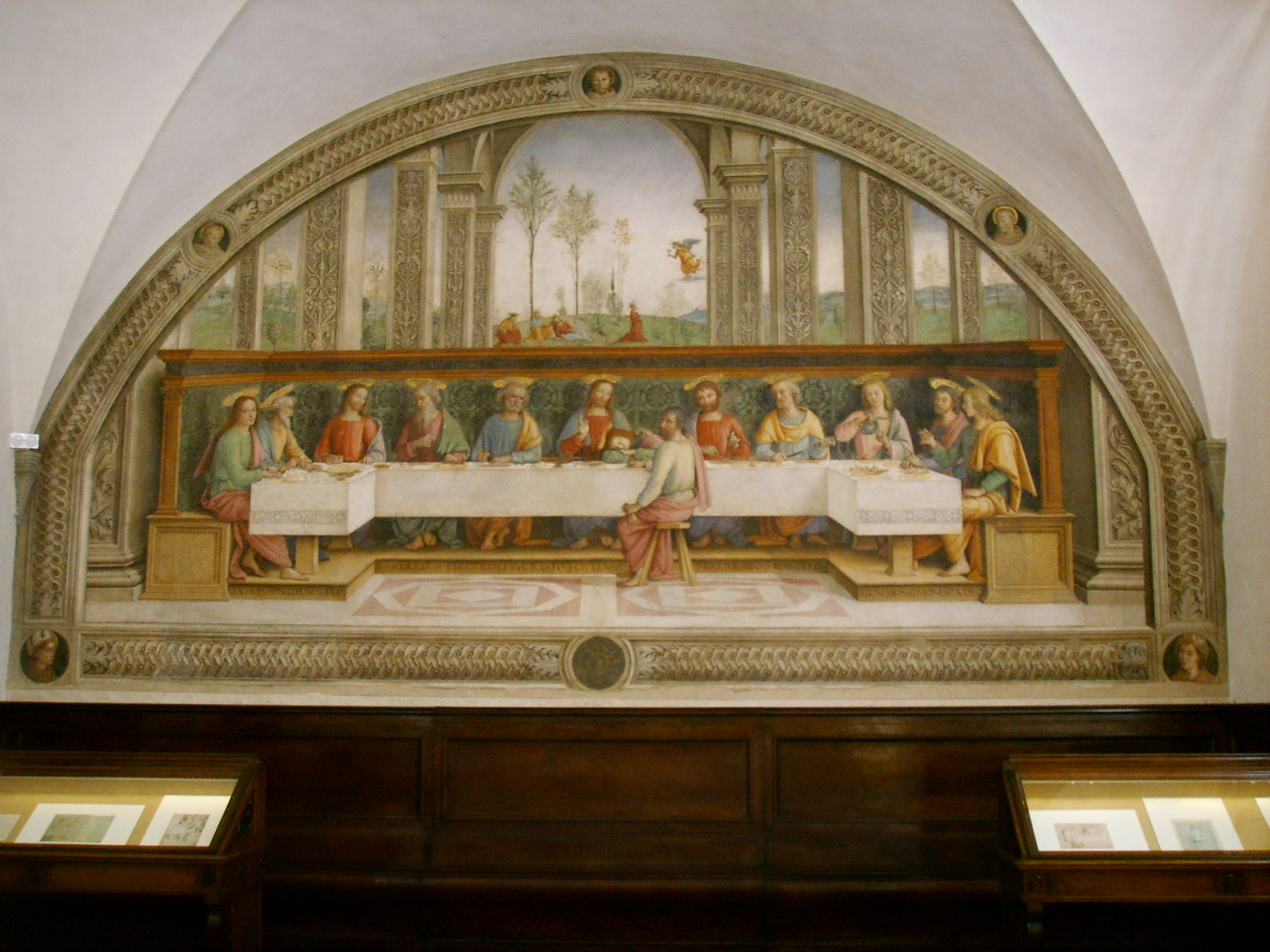
- Artist: Pietro Perugino
- Year: 1493–1496
- Type: Fresco
- Dimensions: 440 cm × 800 cm (170 in × 310 in)
- Location: Cenacolo di Fuligno; Florence

The Last Supper (1493–1496) is a fresco by the Italian Renaissance painter Pietro Perugino, located in the refectory, now museum, of the former Convent of Fuligno located on Via Faenza #42 in Florence, region of Tuscany, Italy.

The fresco depicts Jesus and the Disciples during the Last Supper, with Judas sitting separately on the near side of the table, as is common in depictions of the Last Supper in Christian art. It is considered one of Perugino's best works. As in some other cases, Perugino reused the details of the delicate figures here in other works, drawing later complaints from Giorgio Vasari.

The convent of Fuligno originally had housed Clarissan nuns since 1419. Later it became a convent for noble Florentine girls, and received the patronage of Lorenzo de' Medici and the Lapaccini family. Pietro Perugino, who by 1493 had settled mainly in Florence started to paint there. The fresco was "discovered" and open to the public in the 19th century. It was originally attributed to Raphael, who was a pupil of Perugino later, and whose early style is very similar to his, but it was eventually realized that it was a work by Perugino.
