= The Last Supper (Ghirlandaio) =

Fresco by Domenico Ghirlandaio

Coordinates: 43°46′21″N 11°14′44″E

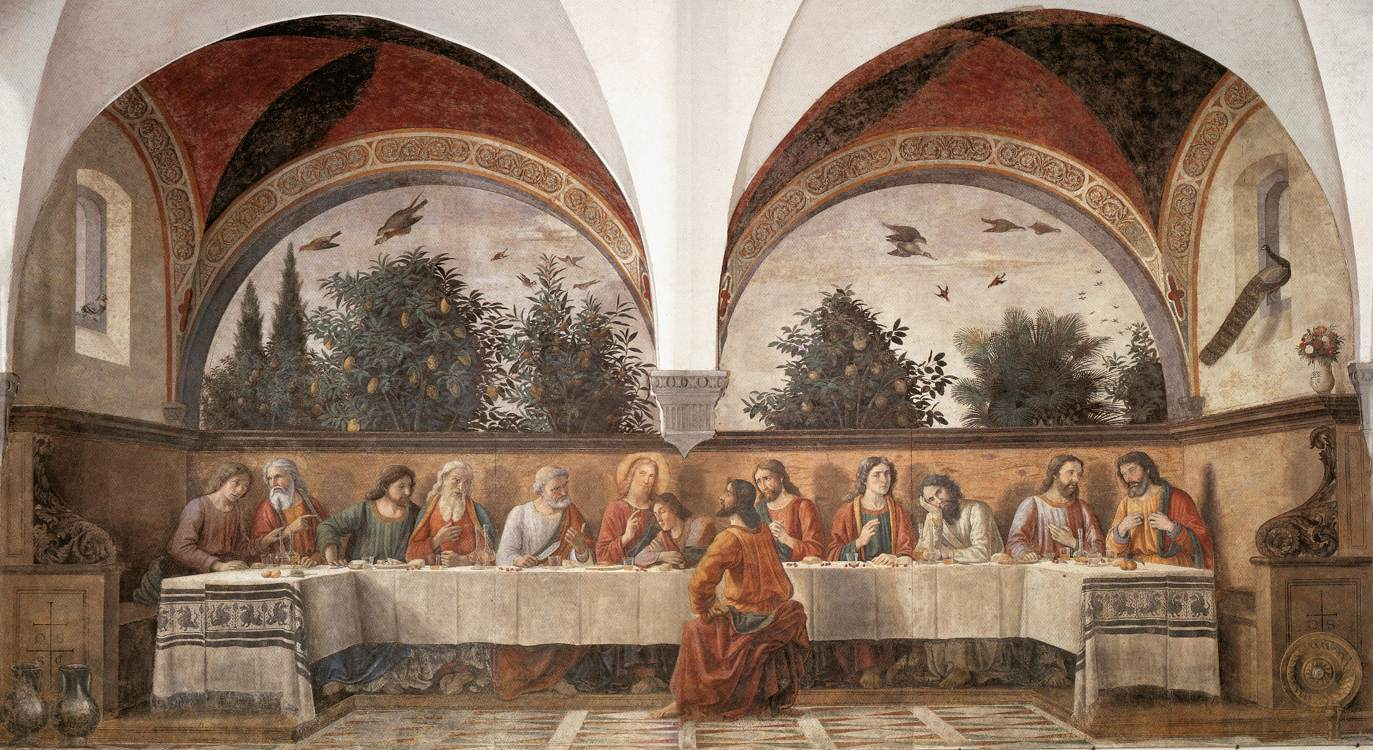
- Artist: Domenico Ghirlandaio
- Year: 1480
- Type: Fresco
- Dimensions: 400 cm × 810 cm (160 in × 320 in)
- Location: Cenacolo di Ognissanti; Florence

The Italian Renaissance painter Domenico Ghirlandaio painted the Last Supper of Jesus three times in separate fresco paintings in or near Florence. The oldest of the three is located in the Badia di Passignano (1476). The next painting is the most famous one, painted in the refectory of the Convent of the Ognissanti (1480). The last painting is found at the Convent of San Marco (1486). The last two paintings are found in Florence itself.

== Locations, subject, and technique ==
=== Locations ===
There are three separate frescoes of the Last Supper that Ghirlandaio painted including one outside of Florence, Italy, while the other two were painted in the city of Florence. Two of Ghirlandaio's Last Supper frescoes were placed in convents in Florence: the Convent of San Marco and the Convent of Ognissanti. The Last Supper located outside of town was painted in the abbey of Badia di Passignano, a religious hermitage under the order of Vallombrosians, founded by Saint Giovanni Gualberto in the eleventh century. Over the years, the Passignano monastery was changed into a farmhouse in 1866, but was re-converted back to its monastic function in 1986. All three of Ghirlandaio's frescos of the Last Supper were placed in the refectory, or main dining hall, where all of the nuns or monks of the convent or monastery would have eaten their meals.

=== Subject ===
In the late fifteenth century, artist Domenico Ghirlandaio painted three frescoes depicting the Last Supper between Jesus and his Apostles. Many artists have painted their own versions of the Christian subject of The Last Supper. The Last Supper is an important biblical story where Jesus and his disciples dine for the final time together before his death by crucifixion. During this supper, Jesus tells his followers, known as the twelve apostles, that his death is soon to come and that one of his disciples has betrayed him. In addition, this is the sacred meal at which Jesus introduces the sacrament of the Eucharist.

Ghirlandaio's interpretations of The Last Supper show expressions from the figures but in a quiet peaceful setting. His figures have character-like expressions and his understanding of common architecture allowed for realistic details throughout his work. The Last Supper shows images of Jesus and the Apostles sitting around a pronent dining table in the shape of a U. Disciples converse, and both Judas and John lean toward Jesus, as is tradition. Jesus is shown near the center, with his right hand raised and index and middle fingers together, which is an archetypal gesture of bestowed blessing. There is an illusion that the room within this piece is receding or moving back into the space.

According to author Jean Cadogan, Domenico took on a secondary role during the creation of these three Last Supper frescos, but still was considered the leading artist amongst his two brothers, Davide Ghirlandaio and Benedetto Ghirlandaio, who were also painters. For the fresco in the Badia di Passignano, Domenico's brother Davide was more involved. Davide received five payments for his work on the Passignano piece, while Domenico only received two.

==== Technique ====
Preserved drawings provide a good understanding of Domenico Ghirlandaio's artistic process. He is thought to be one of the first artists of his time who prepared projects with extreme care. However, the accuracy of this is not known. Ghirlandaio's paintings are frescoes, which is a technique where pigment is dissolved into water before being painted onto wet plaster known as intonaco. The technique was technically demanding, requiring the artist to have accuracy in composition and skillful hands. The color range in frescoes was limited because only certain colors would chemically react with the alkaline of the lime (one of the ingredients of the plaster), including colors such as blacks, reds, yellows, greens, and whites. Some blues, namely those made from azurite or lapis lazauli (ultramarine), could not be painted on the wet fresco, but instead had to be applied in what is known as "a secco" (meaning painted on a dried plaster surface), but this technique was not lasting and often flaked off the wall.

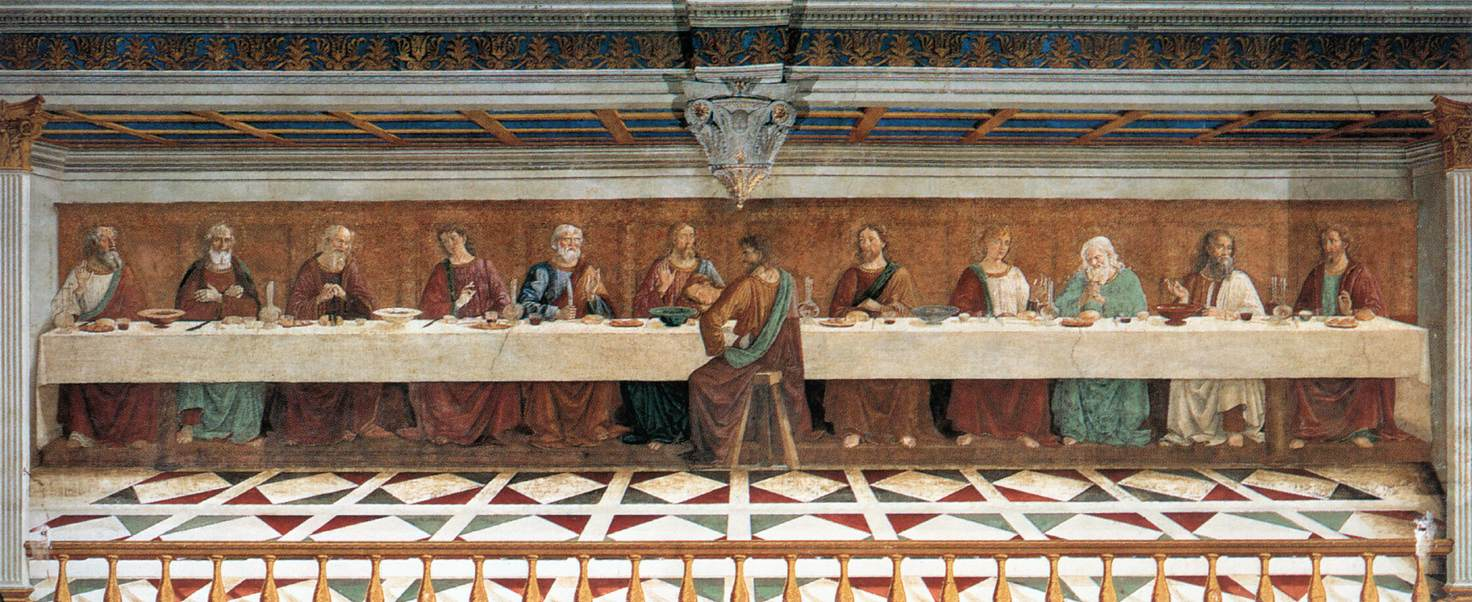
Last Supper fresco, 1476 (Badia di Passignano refectory)

== Badia di Passignano refectory ==
Ghirlandaio created many works in Rome and around 1476 returned to Florence where he ended up working on the biggest work of art he accomplished during his life, The Last Supper in the Badia di Passignano. The Passignano piece was made during a specific period from June 25 to September 1 in the year 1476, and was referred to as the 'refettorio nuovo" (the new refectory). Davide Ghirlandaio, Domenico's brother, played a main role in making this fresco. The figures in the Passignano piece have proportional, realistic body parts and human features compared to Ghirlandaio's earlier figure drawings. There is an illusion of space and depth throughout this piece as well.

== Ognissanti ==
The layout of the scene resembles that seen in the fresco Andrea del Castagno's Last Supper painted some 3 to 4 decades earlier for the refectory of Sant'Apollonia in Florence, wherein the apostles sit in a shallow U-shaped setting, with only the two flanking apostles sitting at a 90-degree angle with the others. John the Apostle at Christ's left has fallen to sleep. Judas sits apart on the near side of the table, as is common in early depictions of the Last Supper in Christian art. However, in this depiction, the upper register is not interior but opens up into the tree-line orchard with birds. The halos of the apostles have narrowed into thin circles; the apostles cast shadows. St. Peter and another apostle appear to challenge Judas.

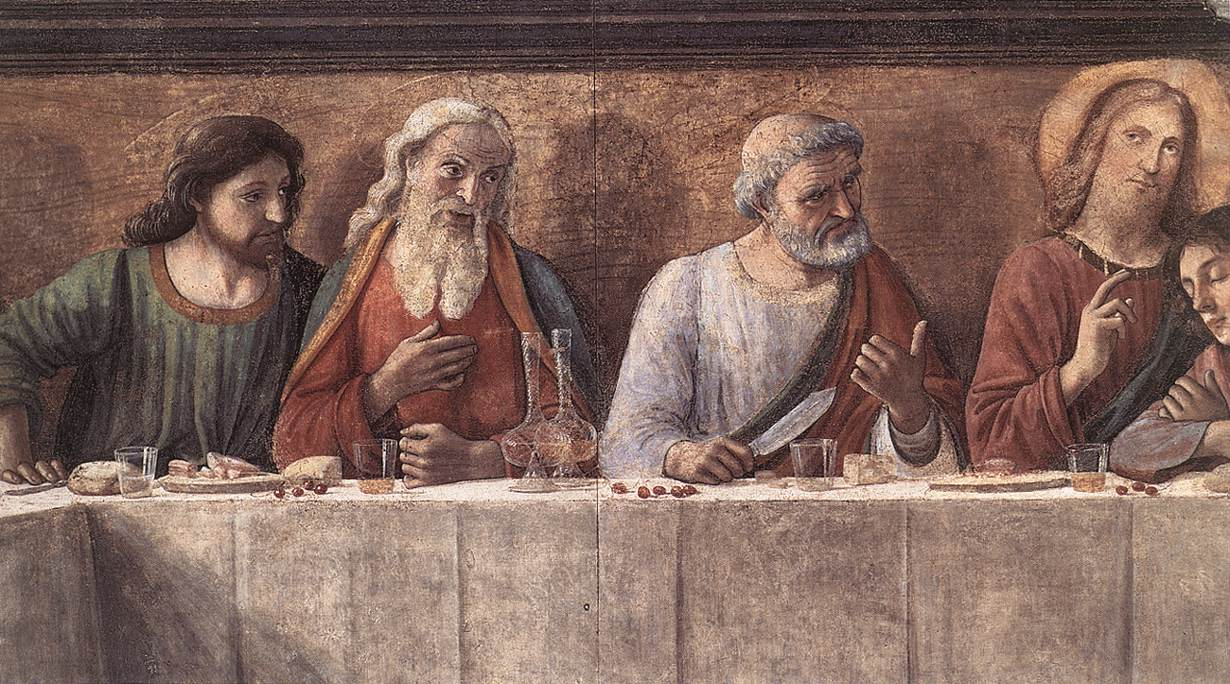
Detail of the fresco

Ghirlandaio was well known when he received the commission for this fresco, and soon after its completion, he was called to Rome to help decorate the Sistine Chapel. It is likely that Leonardo da Vinci was familiar with this treatment of the subject, as well as that of Castagno, and painted his own Last Supper in a more dramatic form to contrast with the stillness of these works so that more emotion would be displayed.

During the restoration of this fresco, a preliminary sketch of it was discovered on the left wall of the refectory in Cenacolo di Ognissanti.

This Last Supper fresco in Ognissanti, Florence was made in 1480 and measures 13 feet by 26 feet and 6 inches (or 4 meters by 8.1 meters). Domenico's stylistic approach draws attention to the recession of space and illusionistic the depth at the back of the room and around the windows, along with the presence of corbels, and the placement of figures. The work is known for the various expressive facial reactions and bodily actions, like hand gestures of the different figures at the table. The Ognissanti piece also is placed at the end architectural bay of the refectory rather than the middle. The main table is U-shaped and is located on the entire east-side wall of the actually refectory. The whole piece looks like a still-life filled with arches and arch-shaped windows. The open upper-story window view includes sights of pheasants, falcons, cypress, and citrus trees.

The work has been described as reflecting the quintessential style of Domenico Ghirlandaio: an overall balance of the symmetrical composition, a naturalism observed in the figures' faces, hair and draped, as well as a clarity in the color palette.

Domenico had been greatly influenced by another fresco of the Last Supper by the Florentine artist Andrea del Castagno: the Last Supper from 1457 (lost in 2002) that was located in Santa Maria Nuova in Florence. By contrast, Castagno's other famous Last Supper fresco (1440-1450) in the refectory of the convent of Sant'Apollonia, also in Florence, was likely never even seen by Domenico.

The face of Christ is heavily restored, as it was repainted on a new layer of plaster in the seventeenth century by Carlo Dolci.

== San Marco ==
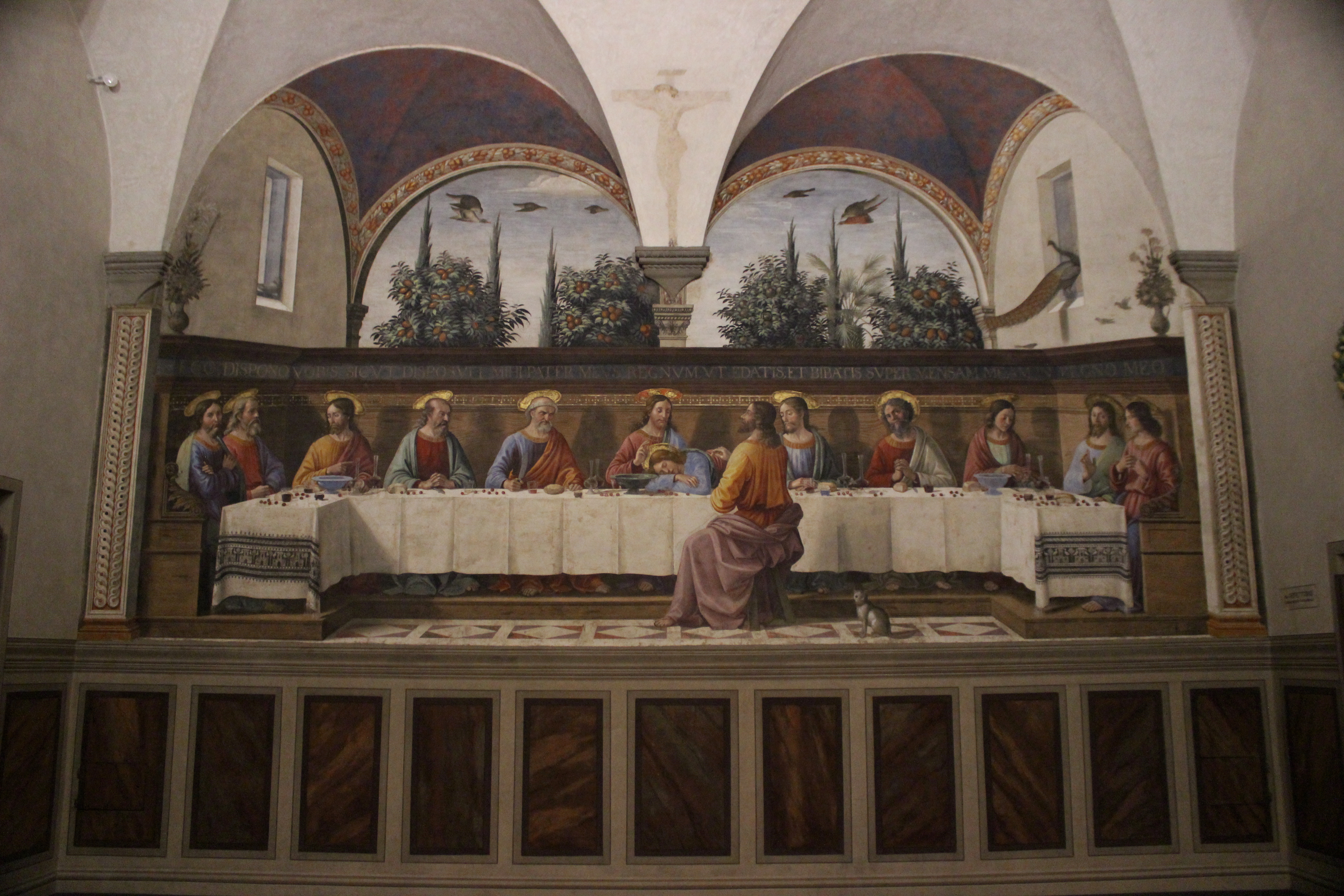
Last Supper fresco, San Marco

Ghirlandaio's fresco in the San Marco convent also shows an interest in realistically depicting the space in figures at a U-shaped table, along with two window arches of noticeably different sizes. In Ghirlandaio's fresco, an array of pomegranate trees and various birds can be seen in the background above Jesus and his apostles.

The figures and table placement look more centered in the room rather than at the end of the room like in the Passignano piece. This was painted on a wall in the refectory of the foresteria, a space where guests and pilgrims of the monastery would usually be housed.

== Sources ==
- Italian Wikipedia
