= Ognissanti, Florence =

Franciscan church in Florence, Tuscany, Italy

Coordinates: 43°46′21″N 11°14′44″E

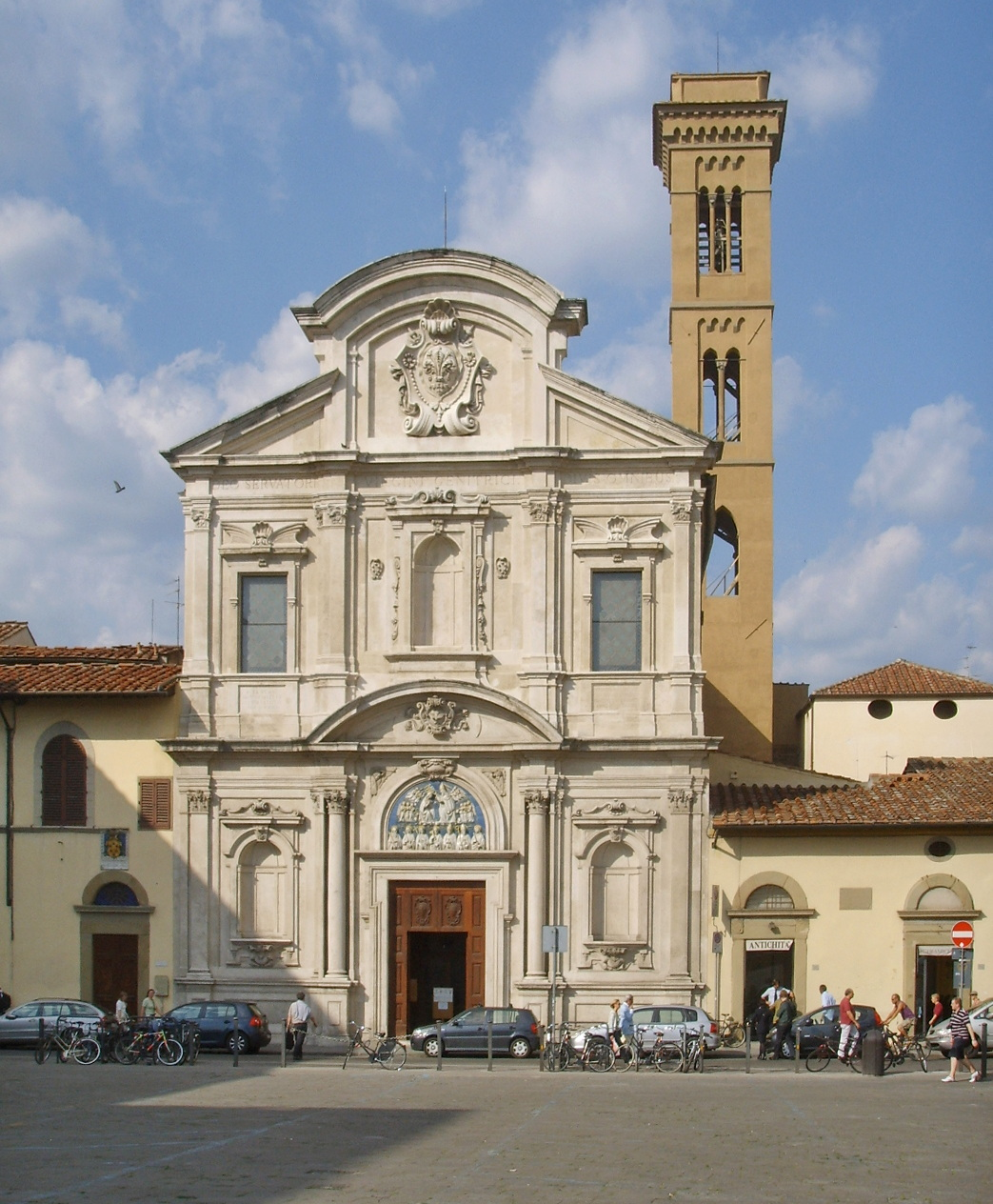
- Ognissanti, Florence
- Country: Italy

Architecture
- Architect: Bartolomeo Pettirossi
- Style: Baroque

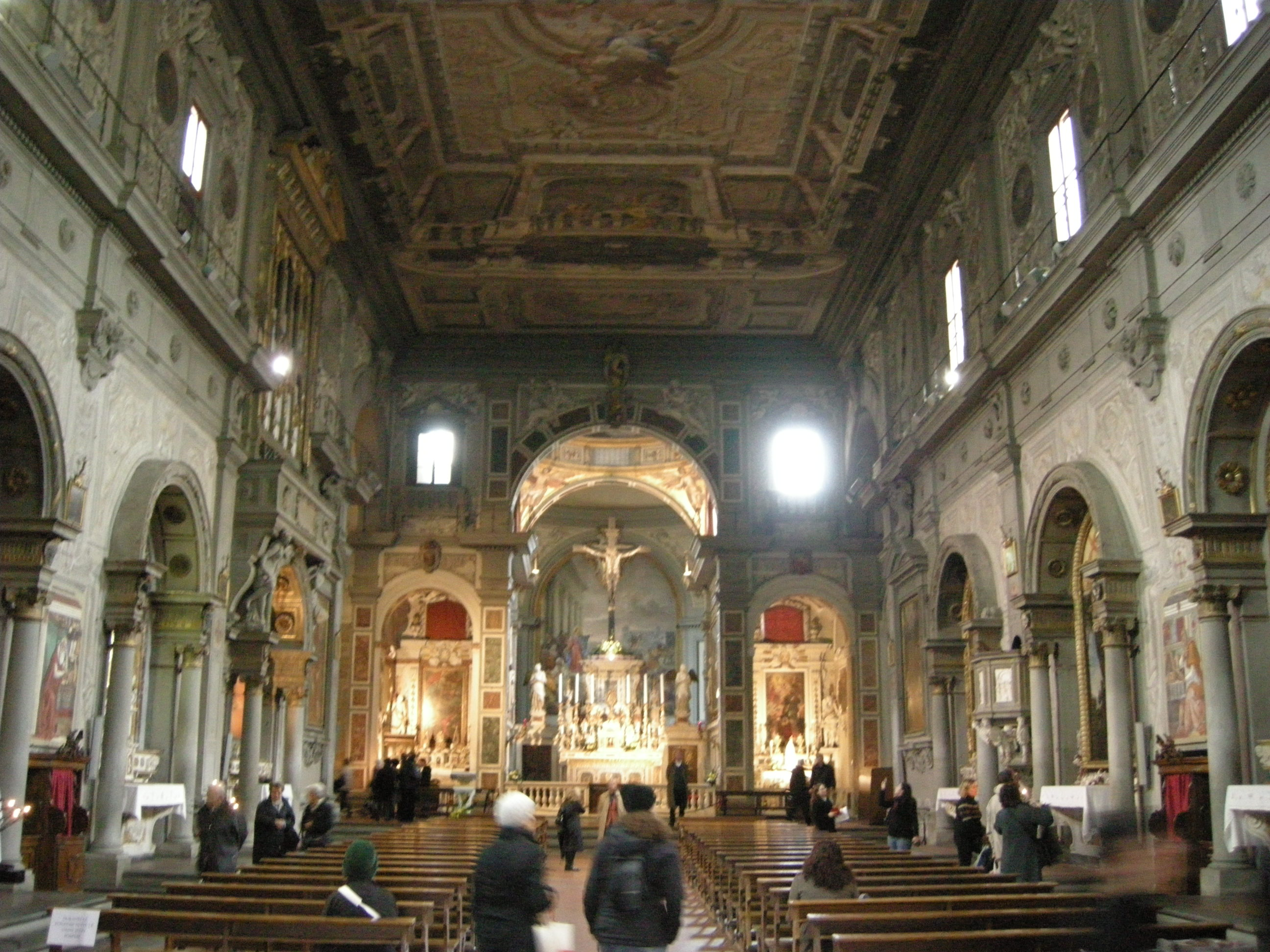
Nave of Ognissanti

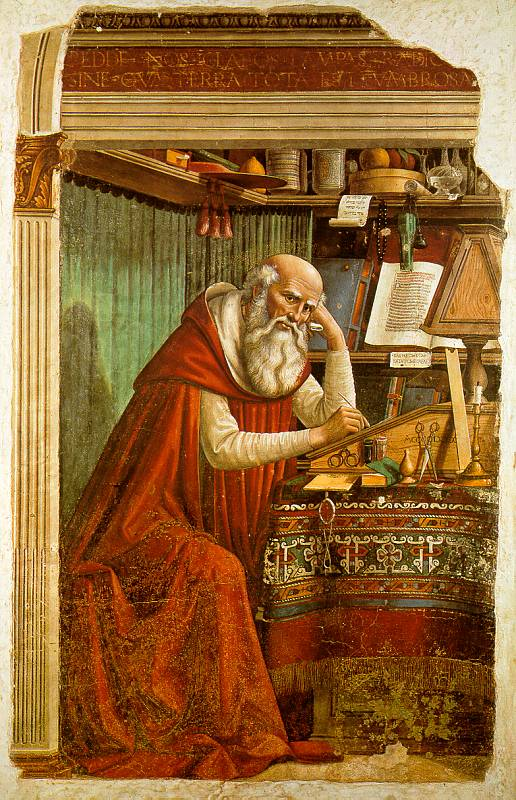
St. Jerome in his Study, fresco by Domenico Ghirlandaio, 1480

The chiesa di San Salvatore di Ognissanti, or more simply chiesa di Ognissanti (Italian: [ˈkjɛːza di oɲɲisˈsanti, ˈkjeː-, - dj -]; "Church of All Saints"), (Note: It gives its name to the borgo, one of the traditional divisions of Florence.) is a Franciscan church located on the eponymous piazza in central Florence, region of Tuscany, Italy. Founded by the lay order of the Umiliati, the church was dedicated to all saints and martyrs, known and unknown.

The church is the burial place of the famous Early Renaissance painter, Sandro Botticelli, as well as of Age of Discovery-era explorer Amerigo Vespucci, from whom the name "America" is derived.

== History ==
It was completed originally during the 1250s. Around 1627, the church was almost completely rebuilt in Baroque-style by the architect Bartolomeo Pettirossi. Soon after that, a new façade (1637) was erected using designs by Matteo Nigetti, (Note: It was restored in 1872.) that conserved the glazed terracotta lunette above the doorway that, while resembling the work of Della Robbia, now is attributed to Benedetto Buglioni. Ognissanti was among the first examples of Baroque architecture to penetrate this city during the Renaissance. Its three reversed orders of pilasters enclose niches and windows with elaborate cornices. To the left of the façade is a campanile of thirteenth and fourteenth century construction.

The Umiliati, by the dedication and probity of the lay brothers and sisters, gained a reputation in Florence, and dedicated works of art began to accumulate in their severely simple church. For example, Giotto's celebrated Madonna and Child with angels (c. 1310) was painted for the high altar. (Note: Giotto's Madonna and child are now in the Uffizi.) A twenty-first century project to clean the Crucifix now in the left transept has led to this work being attributed to Giotto also. (Note: The paintings on panels, always considered noteworthy, had been considered a work of Giotto's followers ("scuola giottesca").)

During the sixteenth century, the Umiliati declined in power. In 1571, the Franciscan order assumed control of the church. They were able to bring to the church precious relics, such as a robe of St Francis of Assisi.

In the early seventeenth-century, the interior was remodeled in Baroque style and the apse was rebuilt with a pietre dure high altar (Note: Built to a design by Jacopo Ligorio.) and a sotto in su perspective painting (1770) on the vaulted nave ceiling. Fifteenth-century frescoes by Domenico Ghirlandaio and Sandro Botticelli were preserved in the nave; Botticelli is buried in the church (Note: A small round stone in a chapel of the right transept marks his resting-place.) near his beloved Simonetta Vespucci. Botticelli's fresco of St. Augustine in His Study faces across the nave of the chapel with Ghirlandaio's St. Jerome in His Study; both were executed contemporaneously in 1480.

Ghirlandaio also frescoed a version of the Last Supper in the refectory that is located between the two cloisters and now is a museum. This fresco likely influenced Leonardo da Vinci's later work in Milan.

In the Vespucci chapel, a fresco by Domenico Ghirlandaio with his brother David, depicting the Madonna della Misericordia protecting members of the Vespucci family (c. 1472), is reputed to include the portrait of Amerigo Vespucci as a child. When Amerigo first encountered a bay in what now is Brazil, he named it "San Salvatore di Ognissanti", in Portuguese "San Salvador de Todos os Santos": this is the origin of the name of the city of Salvador and of Bahia de Todos os Santos.

Above the door to the sacristy is a crucifix in wood by Veit Stoss.
