= Last Supper (Tintoretto) =

Painting by Jacopo Tintoretto

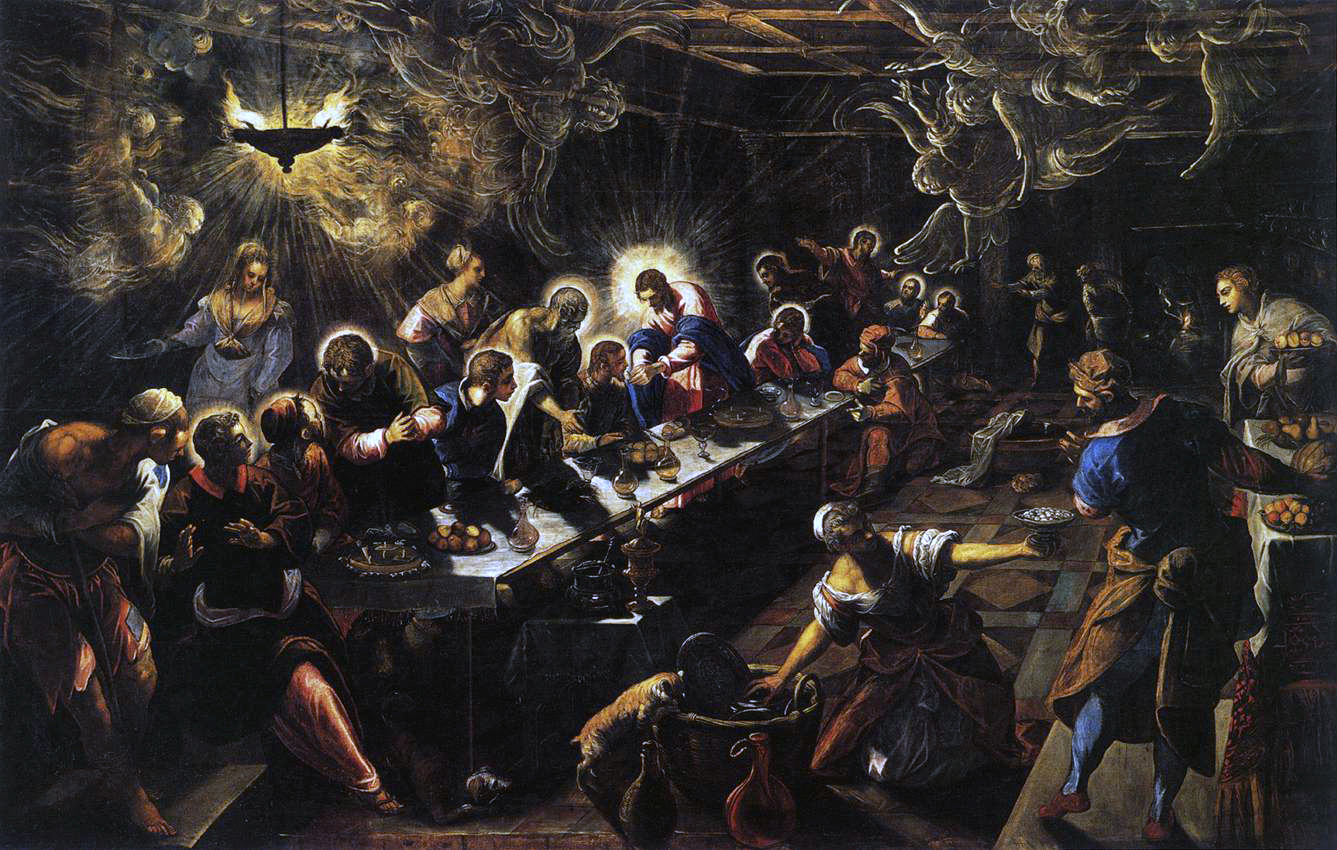
- Artist: Jacopo Tintoretto
- Year: 1592–1594
- Medium: Oil on canvas
- Dimensions: 365 cm × 568 cm (144 in × 224 in)
- Location: Basilica di San Giorgio Maggiore; Venice

The Last Supper is a painting by the Italian Renaissance artist Jacopo Tintoretto. An oil painting on canvas executed in 1592–1594, it is housed in the Basilica di San Giorgio Maggiore in Venice, Italy.

== Overview ==
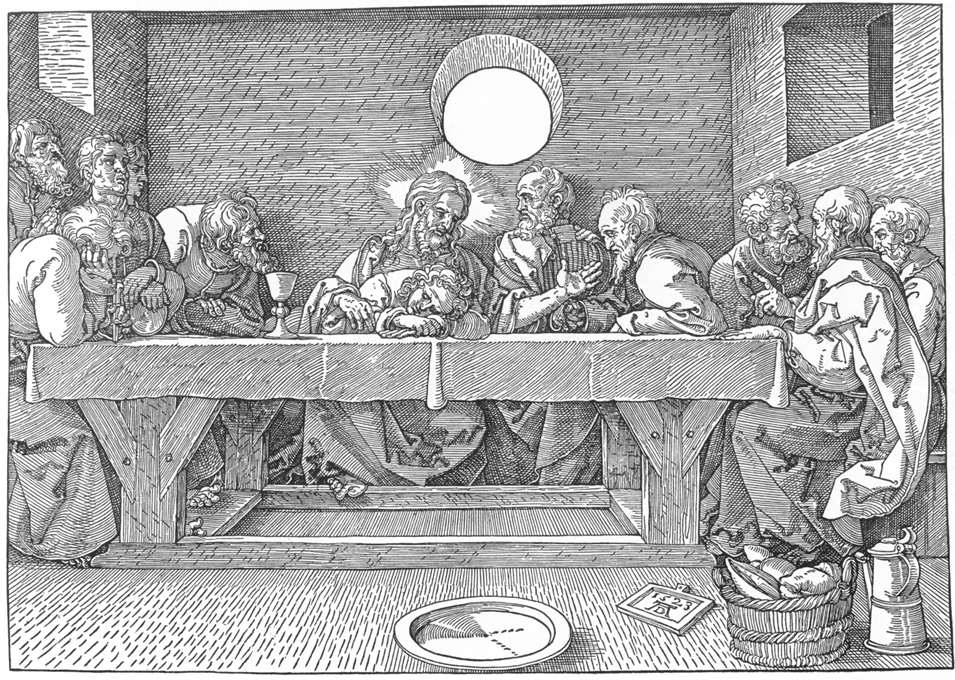
Albrecht Dürer's woodcut The Last Supper (1523) exemplifies the frontal composition that is customary for this subject.

Tintoretto depicted the Last Supper several times during his artistic career. His earlier paintings for the Chiesa di San Marcuola (1547) and for the Chiesa di San Felice (1559) depict the scene from a frontal perspective, with the figures seated at a table placed parallel to the picture plane. This follows a convention observed in most paintings of the Last Supper, of which Leonardo da Vinci's late 1490s mural painting in Milan, Italy, is probably the best-known example. Tintoretto's painting of 1592–1594, a work of his final years, departs drastically from this compositional formula. The centre of the scene is occupied not by the apostles but instead by secondary characters, such as a woman carrying a dish and the servants taking the dishes from the table. The table at which the apostles sit recedes into space on a steep diagonal. Furthermore, Tintoretto's painting features a more personal use of light, which appears to come into obscurity from both the light on the ceiling and from Jesus' aureola. A host of angels hover above the scene.

Tintoretto's Last Supper makes use of Mannerist devices in its complex and radically asymmetrical composition. In its dynamism and emphasis on the quotidian—the setting is similar to a Venetian inn—the painting points the way to the Baroque. "The ability of this dramatic scene to engage viewers was well in keeping with Counter-Reformation ideals and the Catholic Church's belief in the didactic nature of religious art."
