= Kunstmuseum Moritzburg Halle (Saale) =

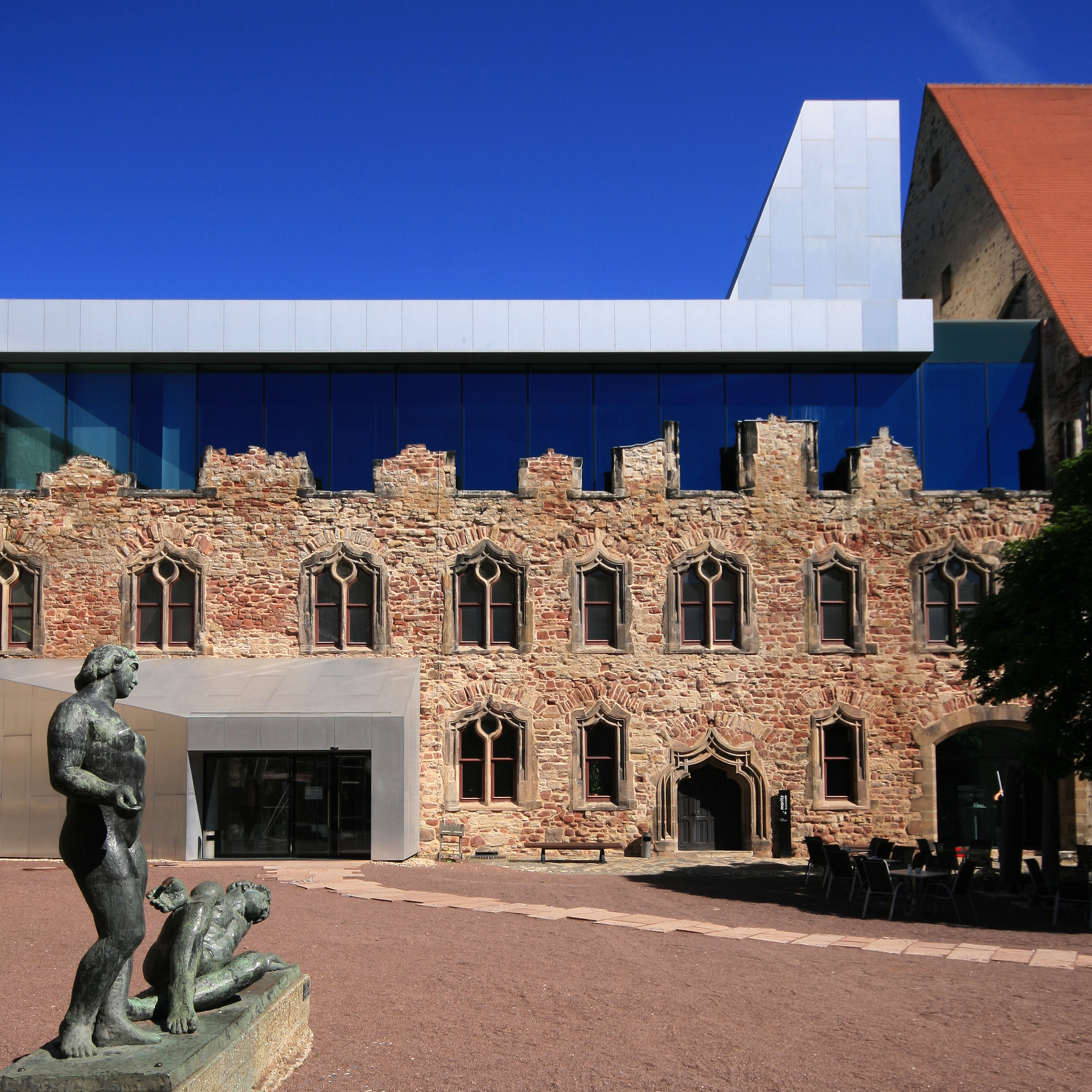
- Entrance to the art museum on the north wing of the Moritzburg ensemble
- Established: 1885
- Location: Halle (Saale), Germany
- Coordinates: 51°29′11.42″N 11°57′49.37″E
- Type: Art museum
- Director: Thomas Bauer-Friedrich
- Public transit access: Trams in Halle, Stop Moritzburgring (Line 3, 7, 8)
- Website: www.kunstmuseum-moritzburg.de/en/museum-exhibitions/the-art-museum/

The Kunstmuseum Moritzburg Halle (Saale) is the art museum of the state of Saxony-Anhalt in the Moritzburg in Halle (Saale), Germany. It emerged from Städtisches Museum für Kunst und Kunstgewerbe der Stadt Halle (Saale) (lit.: Municipal Museum of Arts and Crafts of the City of Halle (Saale)), founded in 1885. In its history, it has developed into one of the most important museums for the visual and applied arts of the era of modernism in Germany.

== Museum history ==
=== From the foundation to the First World War ===
Today's Kunstmuseum Moritzburg Halle (Saale) was founded in 1885 as Städtisches Museum für Kunst und Kunstgewerbe der Stadt Halle (Saale) (lit.: Municipal Museum of Arts and Crafts of the City of Halle (Saale)) in the building of the old Eich- und Waagamt in the south of the historic old town of Halle.

In 1904, the second location of the museum was opened in the ruins of the former archbishop's residence, the Moritzburg, in the northwestern part of the historic old town centre. For this purpose, a historicizing replica of the Thalamt building on the Hallmarkt was erected in the south wing of the Moritzburg ensemble, which had been destroyed since the 17th century. The Renaissance building, seat of the Halle Count of Salt, was demolished in 1881, the two historic rooms (banqueting room and courtroom), unique examples of mannerist interior design in Central Germany, were recovered in their original form and integrated into the upper floor of the new building in the Moritzburg. In 1904, the Thalamt in the Moritzburg, built according to designs by Karl Rehorst, was opened as a museum. By 1913, the construction of the south-west bastion and the so-called Chemins de ronde in the east wing to the city had been completed. It was not until 1917 that the impressive domed hall in the southwest bastion was completed as a barrel-vaulted exhibition hall. Until 1920, the rooms in the old Eich- und Waagamt functioned as a gallery, primarily for contemporary art, and the rooms in the Thalamt building in the Moritzburg for the presentation of the Old Masters and the arts and crafts collection.

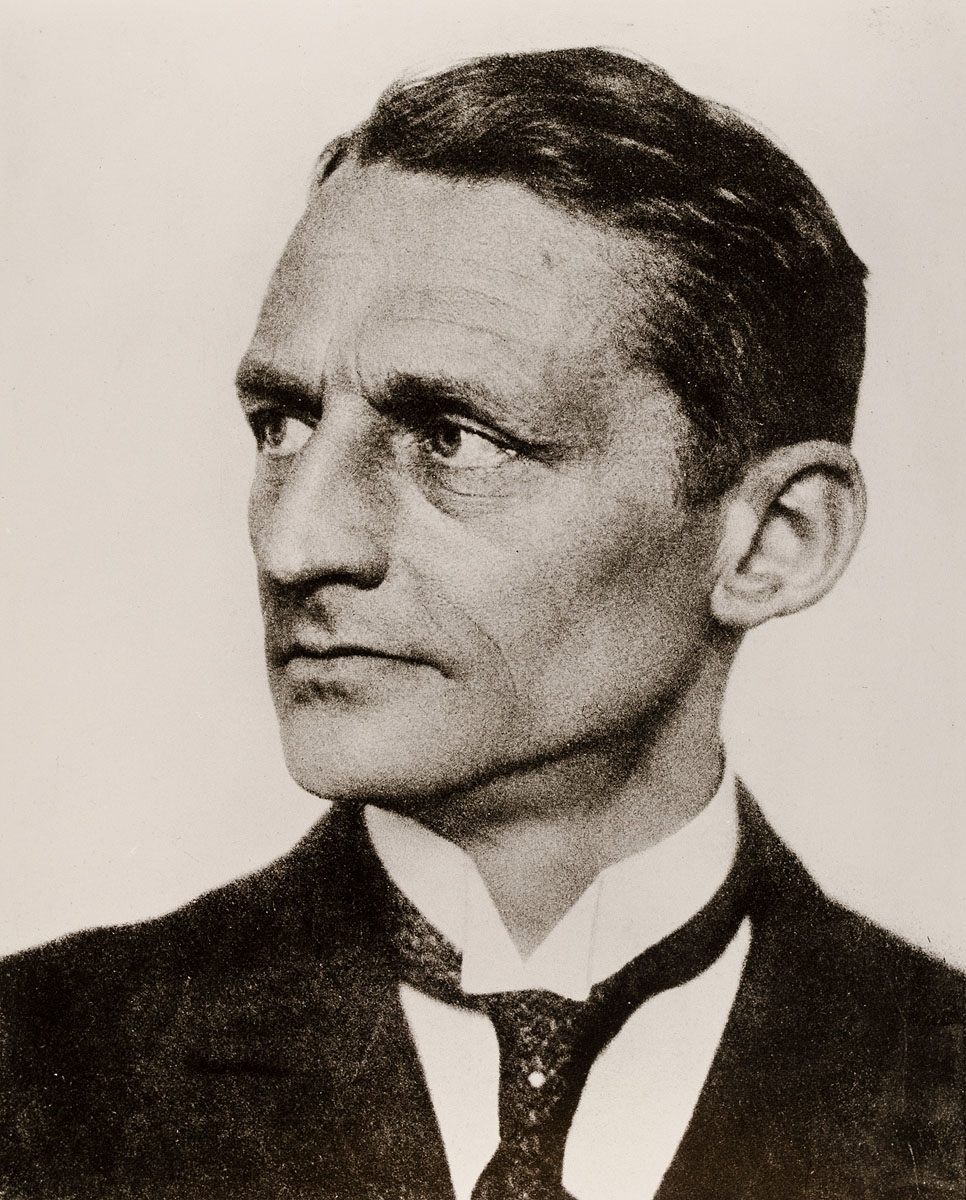
Max Sauerlandt, first director of the museum

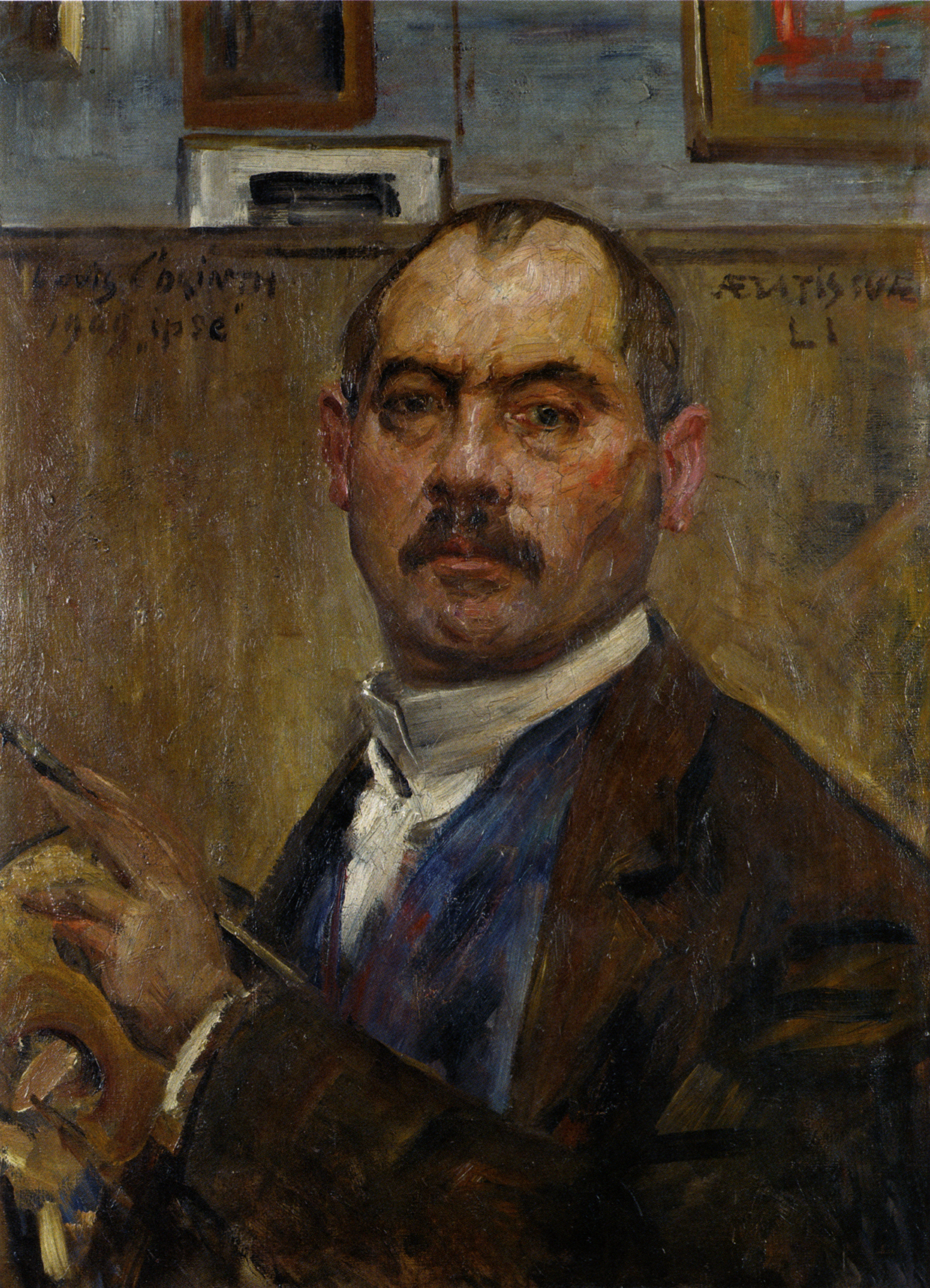
Lovis Corinth: Self-Portrait, 1909 – one of the early acquisitions of contemporary art by Max Sauerlandt.

In 1908, Max Sauerlandt was appointed as the first administrator of the municipal collections paid by the city administration; from 1910 he was officially director of the museum. Sauerlandt recognised that he could not compete with the large collections in Berlin, Dresden or Munich, but he could turn the museum into something special by focusing on the art of the turn of the century and the present.

Until the outbreak of the First World War, he acquired important collections of works by Max Liebermann, Max Slevogt, Lovis Corinth, the young Max Beckmann, Wilhelm Lehmbruck, Emil Nolde and Christian Rohlfs, among others. A year later, the purchase of Emil Nolde's painting The Last Supper in 1913 caused a national museum dispute over the question of whether a museum was entitled to acquire contemporary art. The opposite position to Sauerlandt was taken by Wilhelm von Bode, director of the Royal Picture Gallery in Berlin.

=== Weimar Republic ===
In 1919, Max Sauerlandt moved to Hamburg as director of the Museum für Kunst und Gewerbe. Nevertheless, he continued to determine the development of the Halle Museum until 1926, when Sauerlandt's successor Burkhard Meier was in office for only one year. In 1921, his contract was not renewed after the end of the probationary year. As a result of the Hyperinflation in the Weimar Republic, the director's position was removed from the municipal budget. The management of the museum was shared by the Halle's Mayor Richard Robert Rive, the city planning officer Wilhelm Jost and the acting director of the museum, Paul Thiersch, founding rector of the Burg Giebichenstein University of Art and Design.

In 1920, the museum had to vacate the premises in the old Eich- und Waagamt. Since 1921, all collections have been concentrated and exhibited in the Moritzburg. In the autumn of 1924, Max Sauerlandt brokered the acquisition of 24 expressionist works from the collection of Ludwig and Rosy Fischer. From spring 1925 it could be seen in the domed hall of the Moritzburg. This put the museum in the first row of German modern art museums.

Under the direction of Alois Schardt, director since 1926, the museum was one of the first ever to receive electric lighting in 1929. Under Schardt, the painting collection was also expanded, among other things, with a representative collection of works by the Russian constructivist El Lissitzky and, for example, the Bauhaus masters Lyonel Feininger, Wassily Kandinsky and Paul Klee.

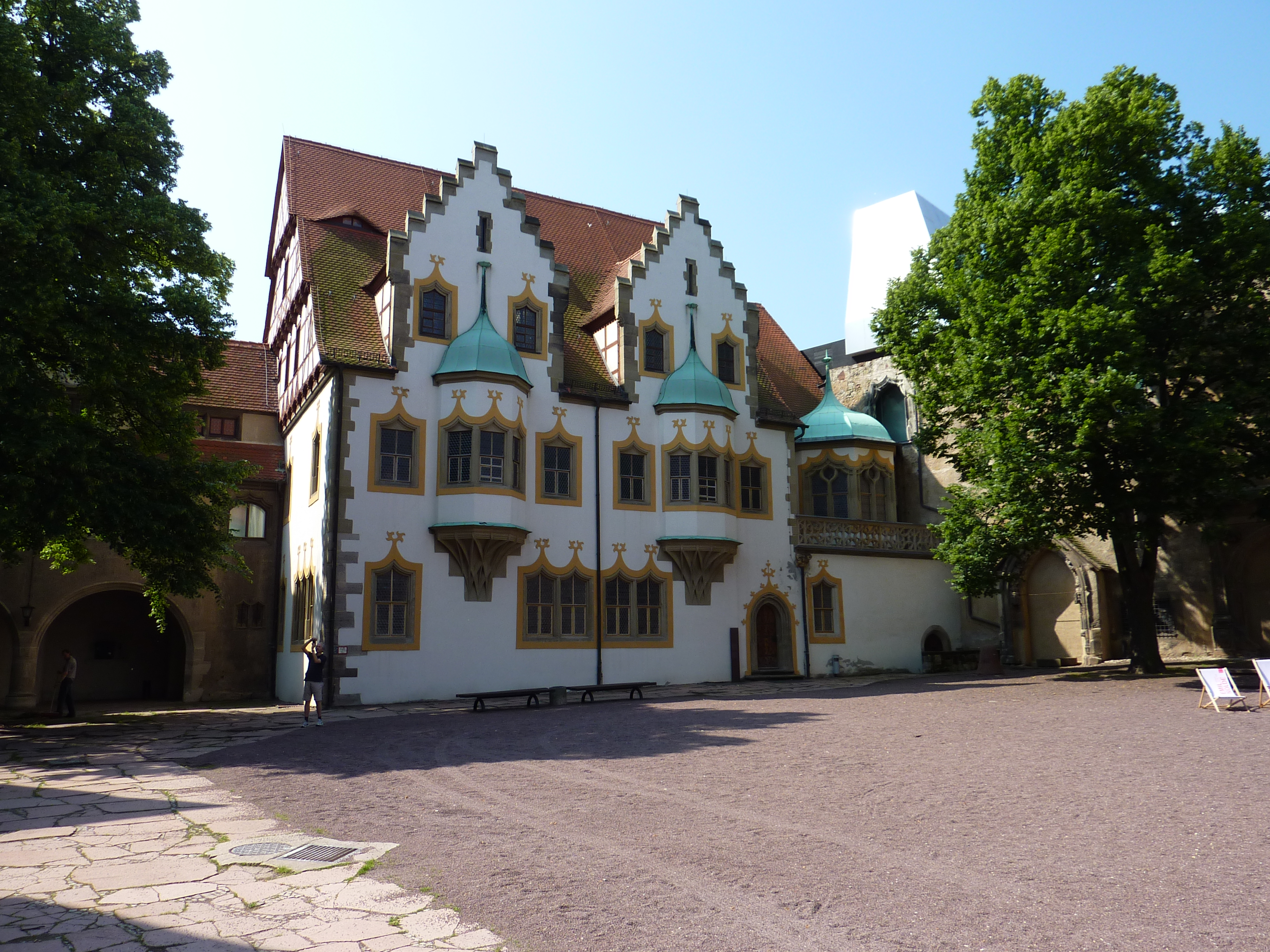
The Thalamt, the foundation building of the Kunstmuseum Moritzburg Halle (Saale) in the Moritzburg. (2013)

In 1929, Schardt brought Lyonel Feininger to Halle as Artist-in-residence for a commission from the city. A studio had been set up for him on the upper floor of the gate tower of Moritzburg. The famous series of his 11 Halle paintings was purchased for the museum in 1931 together with 29 associated drawings. Through other important acquisitions, including those by Franz Marc and Oskar Kokoschka, the Halle Museum earned a legendary reputation as one of the most important museums for modern art in Germany by 1933.

In 1931, Charles Crodel completed the mural Race of Atalanta and Hippomenes (completed on 21 November 1931) in what was then the university's gymnastics hall, now known as the Crodel-Halle in the first basement of the west wing of Moritzburg. In 1936, the National Socialists had it whitewashed. The hall has not been open to the public since water damage during the construction of the extension of the Kunstmuseum from 2005 to 2008 and is to be renovated in the foreseeable future. As part of a research project of the Deutsche Bundesstiftung Umwelt (German Federal Environmental Foundation), it was investigated how the building fabric infested with mold can be decontaminated.

=== In Nazi Germany ===
With the seizure of control by the Nazi Party (NSDAP) and their defamation of modern art as "degenerate art", the Halle collection came into danger. Halle's long-time mayor, Richard Robert Rive, who was well-disposed towards the museum, was retired. His National Socialist successor, Johannes Weidemann, was a thorn in the side of the orientation of the municipal art museum. He pursued the segregation of modern art.

Museum director Alois Schardt had become a member of the NSDAP in May 1933 and headed the Halle local group of the Militant League for German Culture. In the summer of 1933, he was called to Berlin, where he was to rearrange the presentation of the Modern Department of the National Gallery in the Kronprinzenpalais at Unter den Linden. Since he did not do his job to the satisfaction of the National Socialist cultural functionaries, he was sent back to Halle (Saale) in November 1933. From then on, he tried to take early retirement, but he did not succeed until 1936. In Halle (Saale), Schardt fought from 1934 onwards against the orders of the mayor to remove modern art from the public museum tour, which Schardt refused to do with a variety of arguments. So in February 1935 he was given leave of absence and Hermann Schiebel, rector of the Burg Giebichenstein University of Art and Design, was provisionally entrusted with the management of the museum. Schiebel cleared the exhibition space of the museum for a tribute to the city's most famous son, George Frideric Handel, on the occasion of his 250th birthday. From November 1935 onwards, he presented the museum's collection in a public tour up to art around 1900, and in the attic of the Thalamt, the so-called special presentation "Degenerate Art" could be seen for an additional fee and entry of name and address in a "guest book". The most famous visitor to this presentation was the Irish playwright Samuel Beckett, who visited Halle on his trip to Germany at the turn of the year 1936/37.

Numerous paintings were on display from 19 July 1937 at the Degenerate Art exhibition in Munich and were later sold abroad for foreign currency. In August 1937, as part of the Germany-wide concerted action "Degenerate Art", the National Socialists confiscated works by Walther Bötticher, Otto Dix, Josef Eberz, Lyonel Feininger, Ludwig Gies, George Grosz, Erich Heckel, Karl Hofer, Wassily Kandinsky, Ernst Ludwig Kirchner, Paul Klee, Oskar Kokoschka, Käthe Kollwitz, Max Liebermann, El Lissitzky, August Macke, Franz Marc, Gerhard Marcks, Ludwig Meidner, Paula Modersohn-Becker, Otto Mueller, Edvard Munch, Emil Nolde, Max Pechstein, Hans Reichel, Christian Rohlfs, Fritz Schaefler, Karl Schmidt-Rottluff, Julius Tinzmann and Kurt Otto von Tuch (1877–1963). As a result, the museum lost its outstanding works, what had been its identity until then.

To mark the establishment and loss of the first modern collection, the museum organized the large special exhibition Bauhaus Master Modernism. The comeback in 2019/20.

From the summer of 1939 to 1945, the art journalist and NSDAP functionary Robert Scholz was director of the museum. Under his leadership, other of the remaining works of modernism were sold and from then on exhibitions of National Socialist art as well as propaganda exhibitions took place. The museum was open until the end of the war, although the remaining collection holdings were either secured in the basement or for the most part stored in an adit near Bösenburg. Essentially, external special and propaganda exhibitions took place until the end of the war.

=== Soviet occupation zone and GDR ===
As early as July 1945, the Halle magistrate decided to reacquire the holdings lost as "degenerate". In 1947/48, the museum's first post-war director, Gerhard Händler, succeeded in building up a new collection of modern art in the Soviet occupation zone with financial resources from the Ministry of Adult Education of the State of Saxony-Anhalt, which understood itself in the tradition of the lost collection and at the same time integrated modern art created between 1933 and 1945, including works by Alexej von Jawlensky, Ernst Wilhelm Nay or Carl Hofer. In this way, he founded a new collection with important acquisitions, which today contains essential elements of the museum's current collection presentation Paths of Modernism. Art in Germany in the 20th century.

On 7 October 1948, the museum was reopened and the newly acquired works were shown to the public in the first post-war presentation of the collection. In the autumn of the same year, the so-called debate on formalism began with articles of Aleksandr Dymshits in the Tägliche Rundschau. For example, Händler was exposed to massive criticism of his museum concept, which he evaded by fleeing via West Berlin to the Western occupation zones. His successor was Dorothea Haupt, who had been an employee of the museum since 1946 and herself migrated to West Germany some time later.

From 1950 to 1952, the museum administration in Saxony-Anhalt was centralised under Heinz Arno Knorr. Museums and collections in Halle (Saale), Dessau, Freyburg and other places were united to form the Landesgalerie Sachsen-Anhalt (lit.: Saxony-Anhalt State Gallery).

With the East German administrative reform in 1952 and the associated dissolution of the states and thus also of the Landesgalerie Sachsen-Anhalt, the museum was again run independently from 1952 under the name Staatliche Galerie Moritzburg. Expanding the historical profile of the collection, the Landesmünzkabinett Sachsen-Anhalt (Saxony-Anhalt Numismatics Collection) was added in 1950 and the Photography Collection in 1987. Despite state regulation of the cultural sector, the museum's directors succeeded in collecting the widest possible spectrum of contemporary art in line with its profile. Between 1958 and 1968, Heinz Schönemann, director, succeeded in acquiring works of so-called proletarian-revolutionary art, e.g. by using the GDR's understanding of cultural heritage, works by Conrad Felixmüller, Karl Völker, Wolfgang Mattheuer and Richard Horn, for example. In this way, the museum remained one of the most important museums in the former GDR until 1989/90. Until the 1970s, the regular district art exhibitions of the Verband Bildender Künstler der DDR (Association of Visual Artists of the GDR) were also held there.

During these years, in addition to the art museum, the Moritzburg building ensemble also housed a television studio of GDR television, the Kabarett Die Kiebitzensteiner and rooms used by the Martin Luther University.

=== Reunited Germany ===
In 1996, the previously municipal museum was transferred to the sponsorship of the newly founded state of Saxony-Anhalt. In 2003, it was transferred to a foundation, the Stiftung Moritzburg – Kunstmuseum des Landes Sachsen-Anhalt (lit.: Moritzburg Foundation – Art Museum of the State of Saxony-Anhalt), to which the Lyonel-Feininger-Galerie (Lyonel Feininger Gallery) in Quedlinburg was added in 2006. Since 1 January 2014, the Moritzburg Foundation, which is now legally independent, has been managed in trust by the Kulturstiftung Sachsen-Anhalt (Saxony-Anhalt Cultural Foundation) and the museum operates under the name Kunstmuseum Moritzburg Halle (Saale).

Since 1990, the museum has been able to reacquire more than a dozen works that were confiscated as "degenerate" in 1937, most recently a watercolor painting by Wassily Kandinsky in 2017, a watercolor painting by Christian Rohlfs and a drawing by Lyonel Feininger in 2019. In addition, the museum received numerous donations, in some cases entire bundles of drawings, graphics, coins, medals or handicraft objects.

In 2006, the Kunstmuseum Moritzburg Halle (Saale) was evaluated and included in the Blaubuch of the Federal Government Commissioner for Culture and the Media as one of the 23 culturally most important sites in the eastern Länder of Germany.

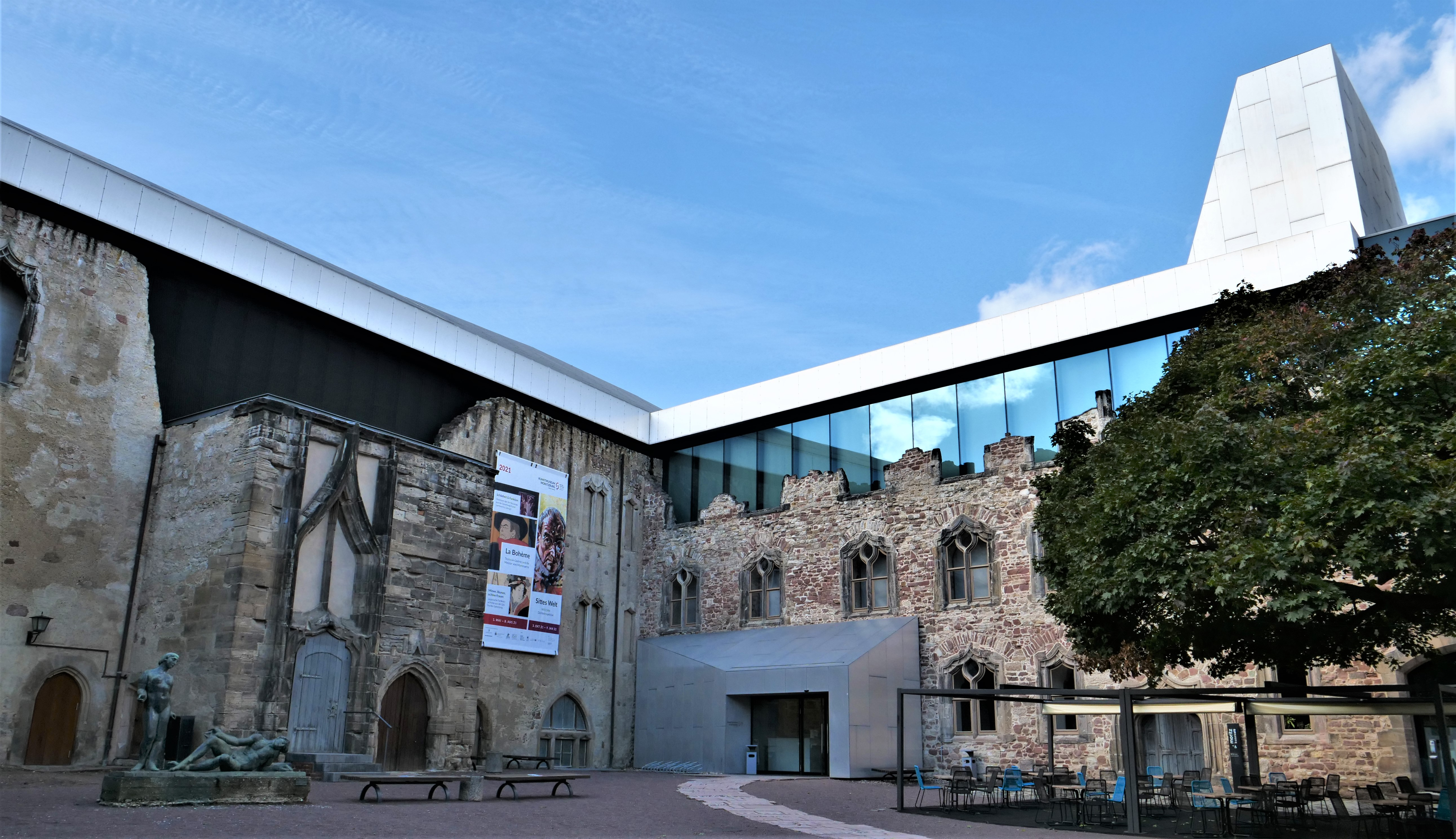
The 2008 newly designed Moritzburg building, architects: Nieto Sobejano Arquitectos

In 2008, an extension of the museum designed by the Spanish architectural firm Nieto Sobejano Arquitectos was completed by which the exhibition space was doubled. Since then, modern special exhibitions have been held that repeatedly tie in with the museum's extraordinary history, such as a major Feininger exhibition in 2009 or a large Nolde exhibition in 2013 on the occasion of the acquisition of Emil Nolde's Last Supper.

Since 2014, large special exhibitions on modern art have been held annually and reach an ever-larger audience, such as the exhibition Magie des Augenblicks (Magic of the Moment) in 2016, which presented the collection of Arthur and Hedy Hahnloser-Bühler from Winterthur, Switzerland, and in 2017 the world's first joint show of the two Expressionists Alexej von Jawlensky and Georges Rouault and in 2018 the only Klimt exhibition outside Austria and the US in the 100th anniversary of the death of the Austrian secession artist. In 2019, the museum made 100 years of Bauhaus under the title Bauhaus Master Modernism. The comeback as part of the anniversary. The comeback attracted attention with a large-scale reconstruction of the historical modern collection, which was lost in 1937. The first retrospective of Karl Lagerfeld's photographs followed in 2020. In autumn/winter 2021/22, the first comprehensive retrospective of the work of the painter Willi Sitte in more than 30 years, took place under the title Sittes Welt (Sitte's World).

In 2020, after several years of construction work, a new passenger elevator was put into operation, as a result of which the exhibition rooms in the south wing, the so-called Thalamt, which had been closed for a long time, and in the basement of the west wing with an extension of the collection presentation. Since then, the museum has offered a tour through 800 years of art history from the 12th to the 21st century using more than 1,000 works from the collection.

=== Move to an Interim ===
In May 2026, it was announced that the Kunstmuseum Moritzburg would move into an interim in 2028. The reason for this is a fundamental renovation of the Moritzburg, which is not to take place during ongoing museum operations. Among other things, the roof must be opened and the castle bridge must be closed as the only access. The interim location is on the Marktplatz in the city centre in the former Galeria department store. There, the museum is to present the permanent exhibition on an exhibition area of 2,300 square metres (25,000 square feet) for 4 years from autumn 2028 and try out new formats. The renovation is funded by the federal government's special investment program, the costs amount to 25 million euros, which will be borne equally by the federal and the Saxony-Anhalt state governments. The museum would like to hold a particular special exhibition in the Moritzburg in 2027 before it has to close at this location in spring 2028 for construction work.

== Collections ==
=== Paintings ===
The painting collection comprises more than 1,700 works with a clear focus on 20th-century art.

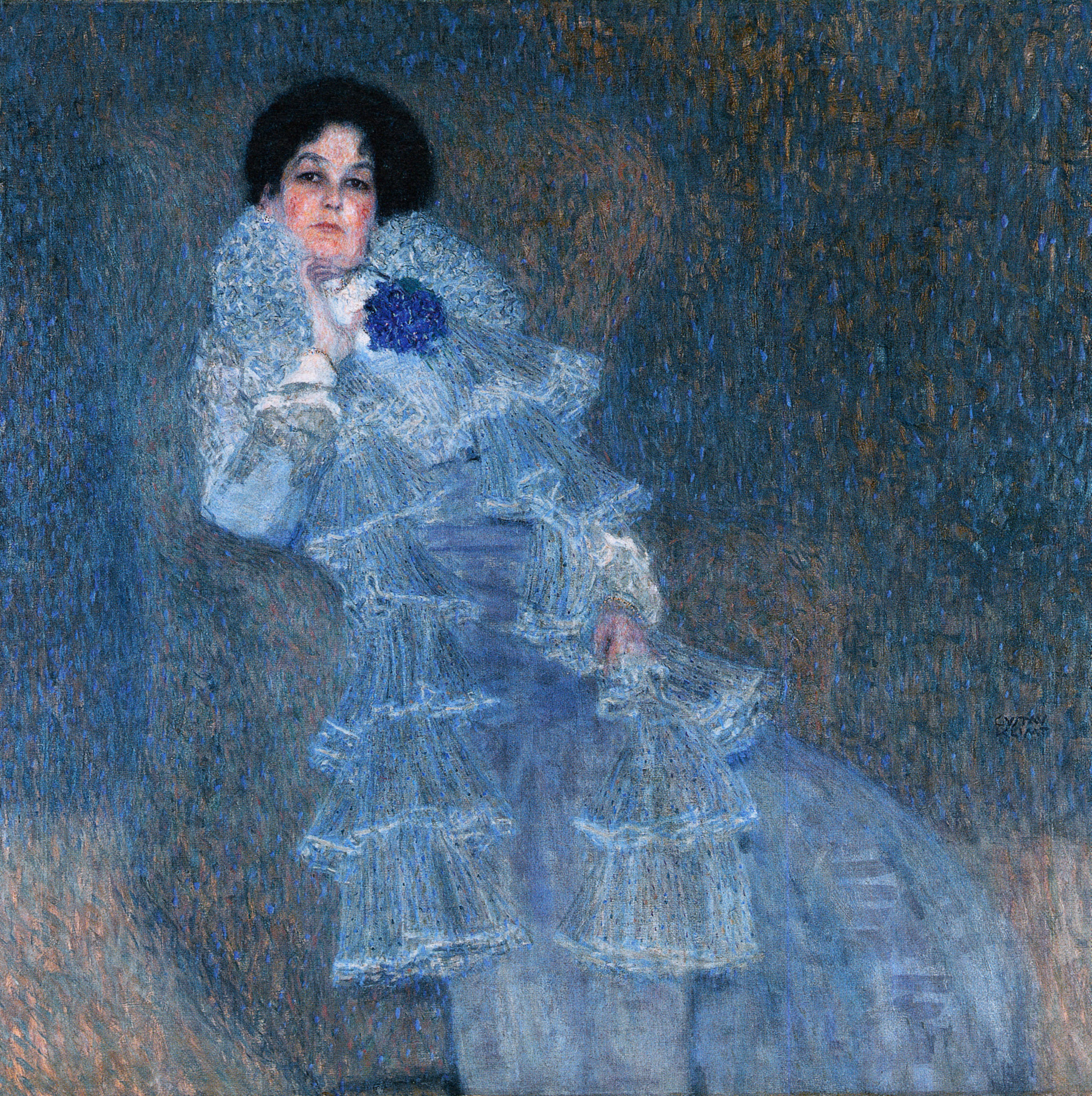
Gustav Klimt: Portrait of Marie Henneberg, 1902

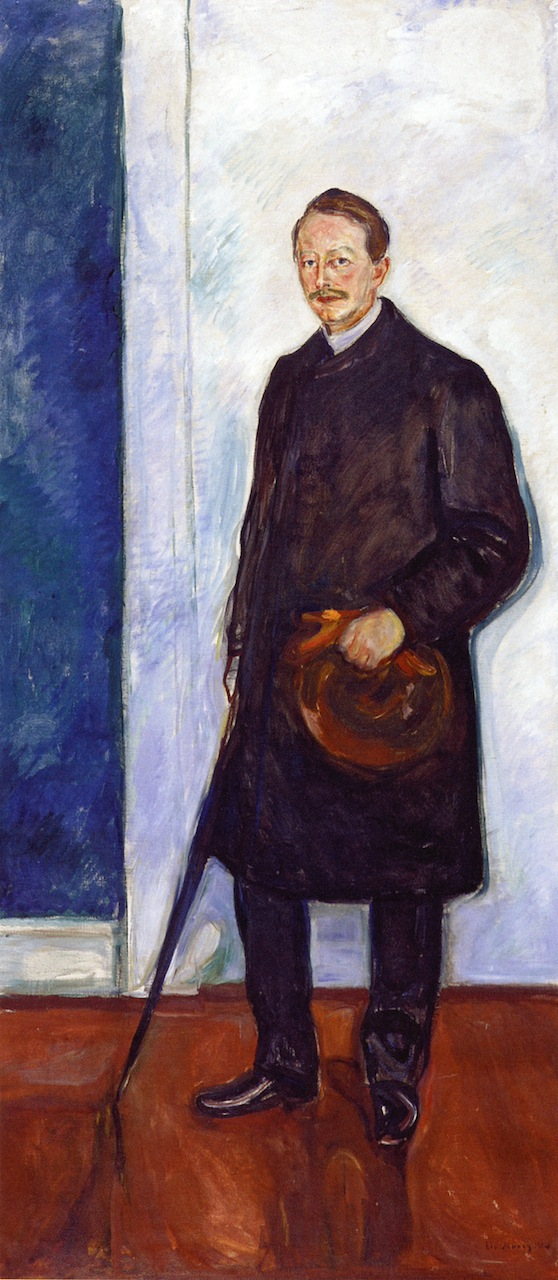
Edvard Munch: Max Linde, 1904

Franz Marc: The White Cat, 1912

Oskar Moll: Nude with Anemone

=== Graphics ===
The graphics collection comprises about 36,000 sheets from early prints to more recent works.

=== Photography ===
The photography collection currently comprises almost 90,000 objects. For this purpose, a specialist library of more than 8,000 volumes has been built up.

=== Sculptures ===
The sculpture collection comprises more than 800 works from the Middle Ages to the present day. Less than 20 kilometres (12 mi) from Halle is the Gartenstadt (Garden city) of Leuna. The Leuna Sculpture Park is a branch of the Kunstmuseum Moritzburg Halle (Saale).

=== Arts and Crafts & Design ===
Comprising some 8,000 works, the collection provides an overview of how the design of receptacles and other objects developed from the Middle Ages to the present day in Europe and Asia.

=== Saxony-Anhalt Numismatics Collection ===
The roughly 50,000 coins and medals and 60,000 banknotes that it preserves include items from all eras and from a wide variety of cultures.

== Collection presentations ==
On around 3,000 square metres (32,000 square feet) and on three levels, more than 500 objects are exhibited in the museum in the permanent collection presentations. They include:

- Paths of Modernity. Art in Germany in the 20th Century
  - Art in the German Empire 1890–1918
  - Art in the Weimar Republic 1919–1933
  - Art under National Socialism 1933–1945
  - Art in the Soviet Occupation Zone/GDR 1945–1990
- Old Masters. Art of the 16th to 19th centuries
- The historic rooms in the Talamt building
- Sacred Art from the Middle Ages to the Baroque era
- Study Collection. Arts and Crafts & Design

In addition, special shows are held in which loans and works from the museum's own collections are shown.

== See also ==
- Konferenz Nationaler Kultureinrichtungen
- Museum Lyonel Feininger
- The Last Supper (Nolde)
- The cathedral in Halle
- Horses in Landscape
- The Step of the Century
