= Sunflowers (Nolde) =

1926 painting by Emil Nolde

- Artist: Emil Nolde
- Year: 1926
- Medium: Oil on canvas
- Dimensions: 72 cm × 90 cm (28 in × 35 in)
- Location: Nolde Stiftung Seebüll; Seebüll

Sunflowers is an oil-on-canvas painting by the German-Danish painter Emil Nolde, created in 1926. It was the first in a series of works featuring sunflowers, and also the first of more than fifty oil paintings on the same subject. It is now held in the Nolde Stiftung Seebüll.

== Description ==
The dimensions of the painting are 72 cm by 90 cm, and it is signed on the lower right edge of the canvas. It depicts three sunflower blooms in strong yellow tones with leaves and stems seen from the front, showing only the upper half of the plants. Phlox plants with flowers in shades of yellow and red are depicted in the lefthand third of the image. Below the high horizon line, an undifferentiated dark brown earth tone forms the background; above the horizon some clouds and blue sky can be seen. The comparatively somber colors that define a large part of the painting area are striking.

== Background ==
Nolde painted over fifty oil paintings dedicated to sunflowers and also created a series of works where he dealt particularly with them. As the first painting on this subject, Nolde titled it simply Sunflowers. Other sunflower paintings were given more differentiated titles such as Tall Sunflowers, or Dahlias and Sunflowers. The influence of Vincent van Gogh can also be noticed in these works.

For Nolde, animals, plants and other natural phenomena had a soul and took on personal traits. Flowers appeared to him as living beings with sentiments and moods that reflected his own feelings, and sunflowers were a prominent motif among his flower paintings. The sunflowers are depicted in this painting as half-length figures, their faces turned towards the viewer. Unlike, for example, in the painting Full-blown Sunflowers, where the flowers slope downwards, here the sunflowers appear to be looking straight at the viewer.

== Provenance ==
This painting, created in 1926, was shown in the German section of an exhibition of international art in Pittsburgh, in 1930, with works by Oskar Kokoschka, Max Kaus and Willy Jaeckel; none of them attracted much attention.

For the next two decades the work was in the artist's possession. In 1950, the General Director of Northwest German Broadcasting (NWDR), Adolf Grimme, bought the painting directly from Nolde, whom he had known before the war, for DM 10,000. In 1955/56, the NDR broadcasting corporations, which still exists, emerged from the NWDR and WDR. The painting remained with the NDR and hung in an office at the Hamburg state radio station of the NDR on Rothenbaumchaussee until it was stolen in 1979, together with Nolde's watercolor Landscape with Farmhouse )(Landschaft mit Bauernhaus).

For a long time, the theft remained unsolved. The rooms had been locked over the weekend, and there were no signs of a break-in when the painting disappeared. Finally, in 2017, a Berlin widow contacted NDR's legal advisor and stated that she had the painting. According to her story, her deceased husband had received it as a gift from a friend who was a production employee at NDR. He had allegedly bought the painting for "little money" from the NDR. This NDR employee had also died in the meantime, so the truthfulness of the information could not be checked. The owner of the painting stated that she thought that it was a reproduction and when she was searching for the location of the original, she discovered that it had been listed as stolen. She then contacted the NDR via a lawyer. Due to the complex legal situation, the NDR paid EUR 20,000 to the widow for the return of the painting.

The NDR had the authenticity of the painting examined by the Berlin Rathgen Institute, which concluded that it had been created in 1926. Manfred Reuther, the director of the Nolde Foundation Seebüll, appraised the work from an historical point of view, and concluded that it was indeed a painting by Nolde, and that the signature, brushwork, colors, technique, canvas and motifs, and its general condition, indicated that it had been created in the period in question.

It was later decided, after a period of touring, that the painting was to be exhibited in the Nolde Stiftung Seebüll.
