= John Jacobson =

John Jacobson may refer to:

- John G. Jacobson, American politician and businessman
- John Christian Jacobson, Moravian bishop in the United States
