= Lord's Supper (disambiguation) =

The Lord's Supper or the Eucharist is a Christian rite and sacrament involving eating bread and drinking wine.

Lord's Supper may also refer to:

- The Last Supper, the last meal Jesus of Nazareth shared with his disciples in the collection of Christian Scriptures called The Holy Bible
  - The Last Supper (Leonardo da Vinci), a painting by Leonardo da Vinci

== See also ==
- The Last Supper (disambiguation)
