= Roman Norbert Ketterer =

German auctioneer and art dealer

Roman Norbert Ketterer (February 6, 1911 in Bräunlingen -June 19, 2002 in Lugano) was a German auctioneer, gallery owner and art dealer.

== Life ==
=== The Stuttgarter Kunstkabinett ===
In 1946, Roman Norbert Ketterer, the former head of the Eislingen-based company for special oils Südöl, founded the Stuttgart Art Cabinet in Stuttgart. From 1947 to 1962, 37 auctions of classical modern art took place here, some of which had been previously branded as "degenerate" under the Nazis. Buyers included David Rockefeller, Stavros Niarchos, and Hans Heinrich von Thyssen-Bornemisza, came to collect modern art through these art events; in general, they contributed to the (re)entry of what is now called classical modern art into the museums and collections of the German-speaking world.

Among those who worked in the Stuttgart Kunstkabinett were Roman Norbert Ketterer's brother Wolfgang Ketterer, who would later found his own auction house in Munich, as well as Wilhelm Friedrich Arntz, whose archive is now at the Getty Center in Los Angeles, and Ewald Rathke, the later director of the Kunstverein Frankfurt.

=== Galerie Roman Norbert Ketterer in Campione d'Italia ===
Between 1963 and 1985, the gallery, located on Lake Lugano, produced twenty-three catalogs offering works of modern art. Thanks to his experience and artwork connections, Ketterer successfully establish himself as a gallery owner in the small Italian exclave of Campione d'Italia. From the late 1970s he collaborated with the Galleria Henze, founded in 1970 by his daughter, Ingeborg Henze-Ketterer, and his son-in-law, Dr. Wolfgang Henze, also in Campione d'Italia. The activities of both galleries in Campione have been continued since 1993 by the Henze & Ketterer Gallery in Wichtrach near Bern and since 2005 by the Henze & Ketterer & Triebold Gallery in Riehen near Basel.

In 1967, a painting “Blumengarten (Utenwarf)” by Emil Nolde auctioned at the Ketterer auction house was the object of a restitution claim. The family of Otto Nathan Deutsch filed a restitution claim for the painting against the purchaser, Moderna Museet, saying that the painting had disappeared when the Deutsches fled Nazi Germany in 1938 or 1939. After a long court battle, a settlement was reached in 2006.

=== Ernst Ludwig Kirchner estate ===
Roman Norbert Ketterer was the executor of Ernst Ludwig Kirchner's estate from 1954 until his death in 2002. Both are buried in the Davos forest cemetery.

=== Kirchner Museum Davos ===
On September 4, 1992, the house founded by Roman Norbert Ketterer and his wife Rosemarie Ketterer (1922–2017) The new building of the Kirchner Museum Davos in Davos, which was donated to the museum, was officially opened featuring approximately 500 works and 160 sketchbooks from the estate of Ernst Ludwig Kirchner, which were recorded in a catalog raisonné by Gerd Presler in 1996. In 2019, they were digitized and put online.

In 2011 Roman Norbert Ketterer (posthumously) as well as Rosemarie Ketterer were awarded honorary citizenship of Davos Landschaft.

== Links ==
- Galerie Henze & Ketterer Wichtrach/Bern
- Galerie Henze & Ketterer & Triebold Riehen/Basel
- Anja Heuß: Roman Norbert Ketterer (1911–2002), in: Stadtarchiv Stuttgart: Digitales Stadtlexikon Stuttgart, publiziert am 13. August 2019.
- "Der Mann mit dem Flair". Der Spiegel. No. 35. August 23, 1960.
