= The Last Supper (disambiguation) =

The Last Supper refers to the last meal that Jesus Christ took with his disciples.

The Last Supper may also refer to:

== Artwork ==
Depictions of the Last Supper in Christian art:

- Last Supper (Castagno), a 1447 painting by Andrea del Castagno
- Last Supper (Rosselli) (1481–1482), a fresco by Biagio d'Antonio in the Sistine Chapel
- Last Supper (Perugino) (1493–1496), a fresco by Pietro Perugino
- The Last Supper (Leonardo) (1495–1498), a mural painting by Leonardo da Vinci
- Altarpiece of the Holy Sacrament or Last Supper, a 1464–1467 painting in a triptych altarpiece by Dieric Bouts
- Last Supper (Ghirlandaio), a 1480 painting by Domenico Ghirlandaio
- The Last Supper, a 1542 painting by Jacopo Bassano
- The Last Supper (1555–1562), a painting by Vicente Juan Masip
- Last Supper (Cranach), 1565 by Lucas Cranach the Younger
- The Last Supper (Damaskinos), 1591 painting by Michael Damaskinos
- The Last Supper (Tintoretto), a 1594 painting by Tintoretto
- The Last Supper, a 16th-century painting by Plautilla Nelli
- The Last Supper (Crespi) (1624–1625), by Daniele Crespi
- Last Supper (Rubens) (1630–1631), a 1631 painting by Peter Paul Rubens
- The Last Supper, a 1648 painting by Philippe de Champaigne
- Last Supper, a 17th-century painting by Nicolas Poussin
- The Last Supper, a 1721 painting by Gustavus Hesselius
- The Last Supper, an 1861 painting by Nikolai Ge
- The Last Supper, a 19th-century painting by Pascal Dagnan-Bouveret
- The Last Supper (Nolde), a 1909 painting by Emil Nolde
- The Last Supper (Pisani), a 1917 painting by Lazzaro Pisani
- The Sacrament of the Last Supper (1955), by Salvador Dalí
- The Last Supper (Warhol), a (1984-1986) series of paintings by Andy Warhol
- The Last Supper (Ribera), a 1651 oil on canvas painting by Jusepe de Ribera

== Film ==
- The Last Supper (1976 film), an historical film by Tomás Gutiérrez Alea
- Last Supper (1992 film), BBC television film directed by Robert Frank
- The Last Supper (1994 film), a Canadian drama by Cynthia Roberts
- The Last Supper (1995 film), a comedy-drama starring Cameron Diaz
- The Last Supper (2003 film), a South Korean comedy
- The Last Supper (2006 film), a comedic short film
- The Last Supper (2012 film), a Chinese historical film
- The Last Supper (2014 film), an Indian thriller film
- The Last Supper (2025 film), an American drama film
- Last Supper (2014 film), also titled Going to America, an American film

== Government ==
- Last Supper (Defense industry), a meal hosted at the Pentagon at the end of the Cold War concerning the future of the US defense industry

== Music ==
- The Last Supper (Black Sabbath video), a video/DVD featuring the band's live onstage shows from their 1999 U.S tour
- The Last Supper, a 1995 album by Belphegor
- The Last Supper (Jim Gaffigan album), 2004
- The Last Supper (Grave Digger album), 2005
- The Last Supper: Live at Hammerstein Ballroom, a 2006 Coheed and Cambria concert DVD
- "The Last Supper", a song in the 1970 rock opera Jesus Christ Superstar
- The Last Supper (opera), a 2000 opera

== Other arts and entertainment ==
- Chew – The Last Suppers, a comic book series by John Layman and Rob Guillory
- The Last Supper (novel), a 1983 novel by Charles McCarry
- "The Last Supper" (Broad City), a 2014 television episode
- "Last Supper" (The Outer Limits), a 1997 television episode
- "The Last Supper," a 1989 episode of War of the Worlds
- The Last Supper, the first entry in the Giovanni Chronicles series of tabletop game books
- "The Last Supper", an episode of the Docuseries Life After People focusing on what would happen to food if people disappeared

== See also ==
- Eucharist, or the Lord's Supper
- Last meal, customarily given to a condemned prisoner
