= Christian Rohlfs =

German painter

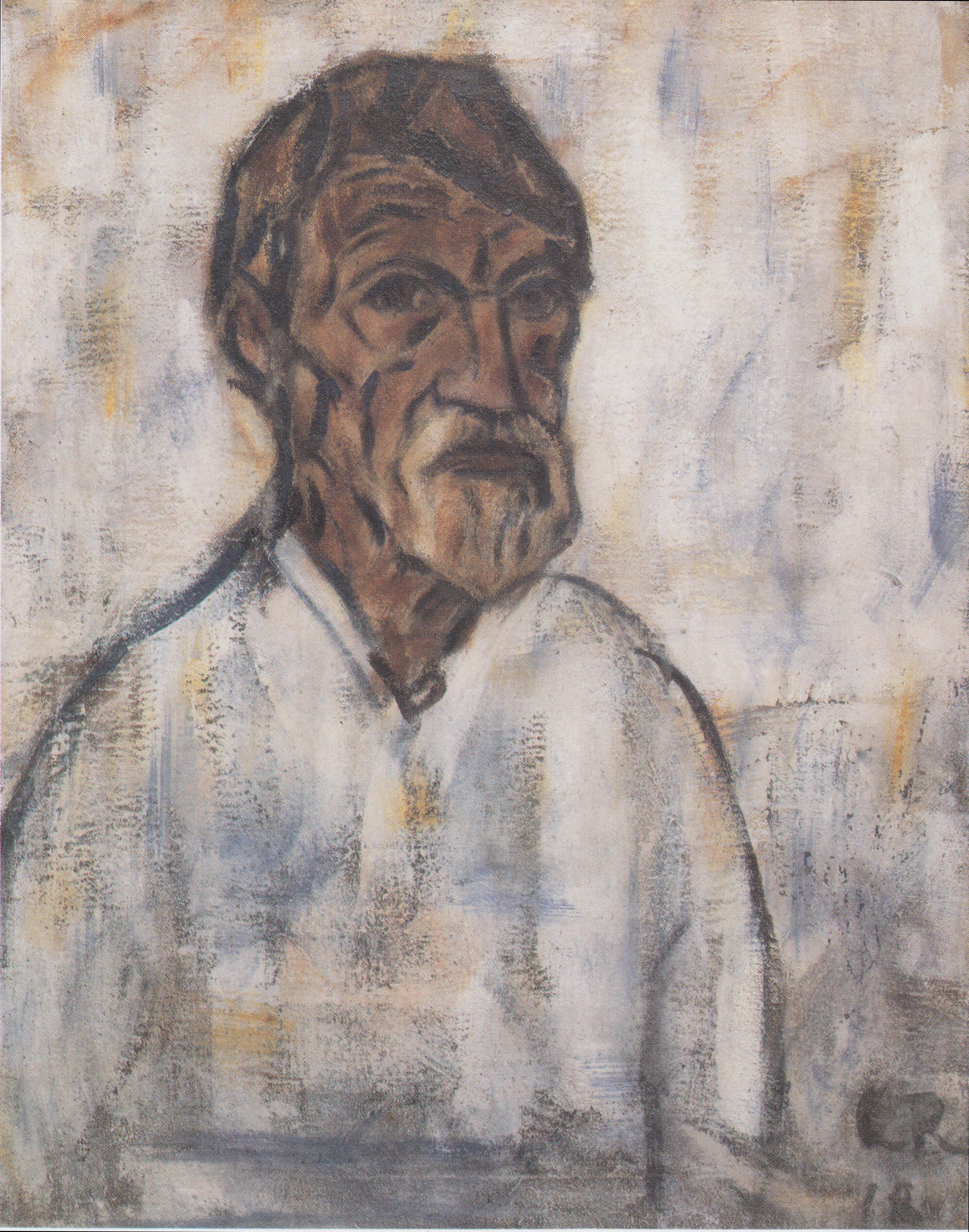
- Christian Rohlfs, self-portrait (1918)
- Born: Christian Rohlfs; 22 November 1849; Groß Niendorf, Holstein, Germany
- Died: 8 January 1938 (aged 88); Hagen, Prussia, Germany

Christian Rohlfs (November 22, 1849 - January 8, 1938) was a German painter and printmaker, one of the important representatives of German expressionism.

== Early life and education ==
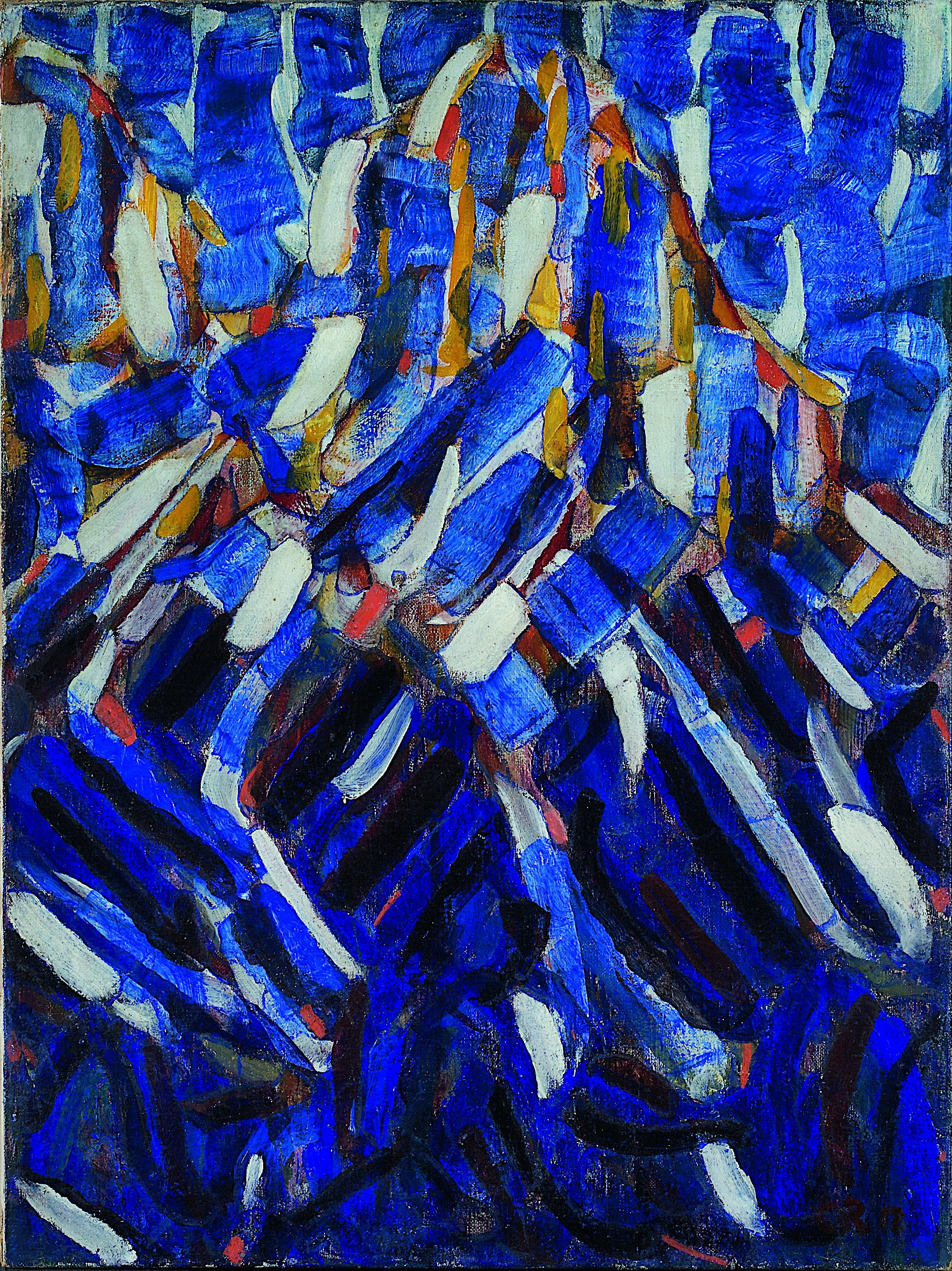
Abstraction (the Blue Mountain) (1912)

He was born in Groß Niendorf, Kreis Segeberg in Prussia. He took up painting as a teenager while convalescing from an infection that was eventually to lead to the amputation of a leg in 1874. He began his formal artistic education in Berlin, before transferring, in 1870, to the Weimar Academy.

== Professional career ==
In 1901 Rohlfs left Weimar for Hagen, where through the architect Henri van der Velde got to know the art collector Karl Ernst Osthaus who offered him a studio in an estate which would become the Museum Folkwang. Rohlfs was the first artist to begin to work there. Meetings with Edvard Munch and Emil Nolde and the experience of seeing the works of Vincent van Gogh inspired him to move towards the expressionist style, in which he would work for the rest of his career.

In 1908, at the age of 60, he made his first prints after seeing an exhibition of works by the expressionist group Die Brücke. He went on to make 185 in total, almost all woodcuts or linocuts. He lived in Munich and the Tyrol in 1910–12, before returning to Hagen.. The outbreak of World War I worried Rohlfs such, that for some time he felt unable to paint. In rare instances he experimented with heavily hand-coloring his prints, onto the verge of painting and sometimes well after they were made, as in his 1919 recoloring of the prior year's Der Gefangene.

In May 1922 he attended the International Congress of Progressive Artists and signed the "Founding Proclamation of the Union of Progressive International Artists". In 1937 the Nazis expelled him from the Prussian Academy of Arts, condemned his work as degenerate, and removed his works from public collections. Seventeen of his paintings were exhibited in the Degenerate Art Exhibition in 1937. He died in Hagen, Westfalia, on 8 January 1938.

=== Style and technique ===
Throughout his career he working through a variety of academic, naturalist, impressionist, and Post-Impressionist styles. He has often been viewed as one of the first Expressionists.

=== Reception ===
After his death, the German Nazi authorities prohibited the sale of his paintings. Commemorative exhibitions were organized by the Kunstmuseum Basel and the Berner Kunsthalle.

== Recognition ==
- In 1929 the town of Hagen opened a Christian Rohlfs Museum.
- Honorary citizen of Hagen
- Honorary Doctorate by University of Kiel
- Honorary Doctorate by University of Aachen

== Works ==
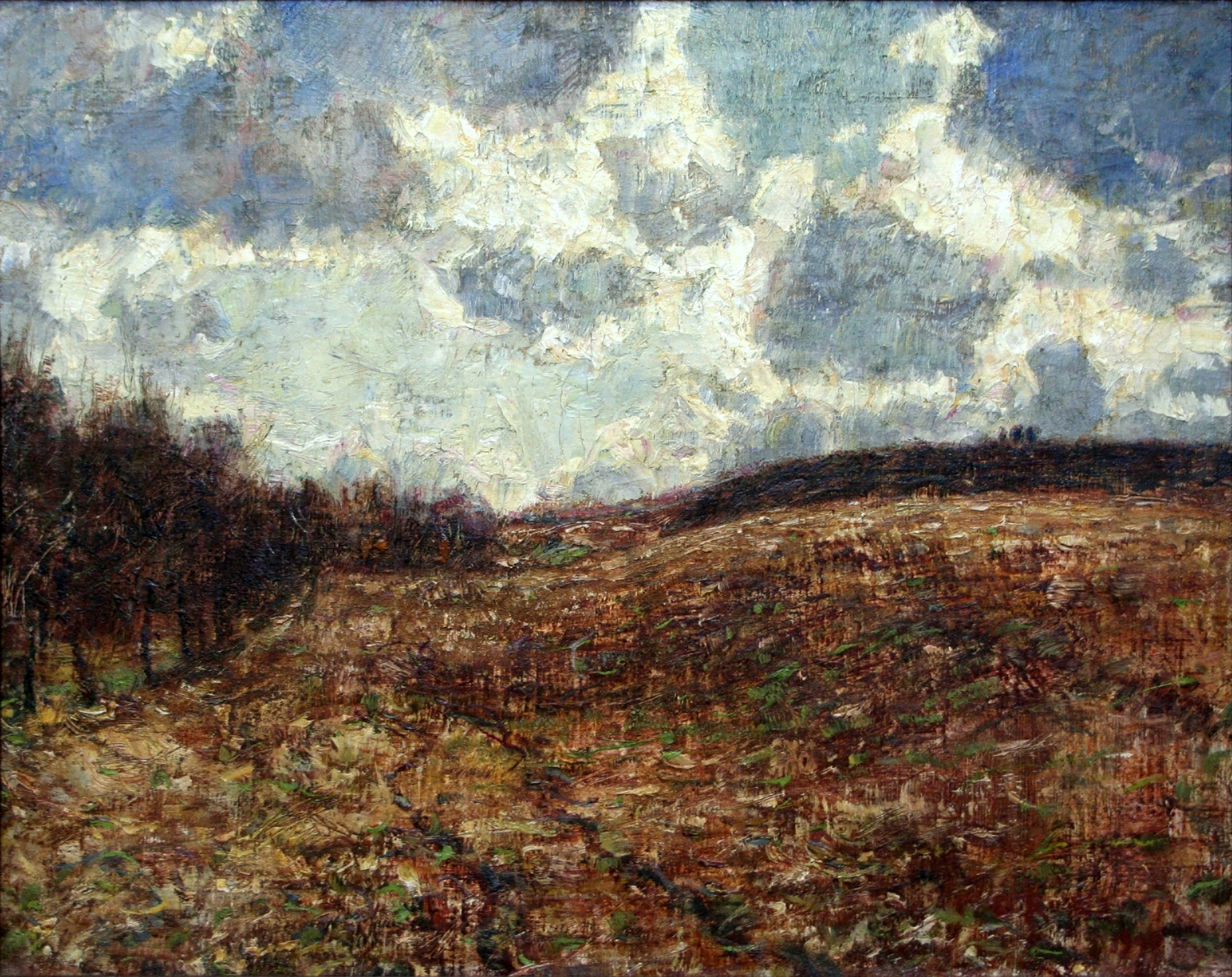
Hilly landscape in late autumn, 1900

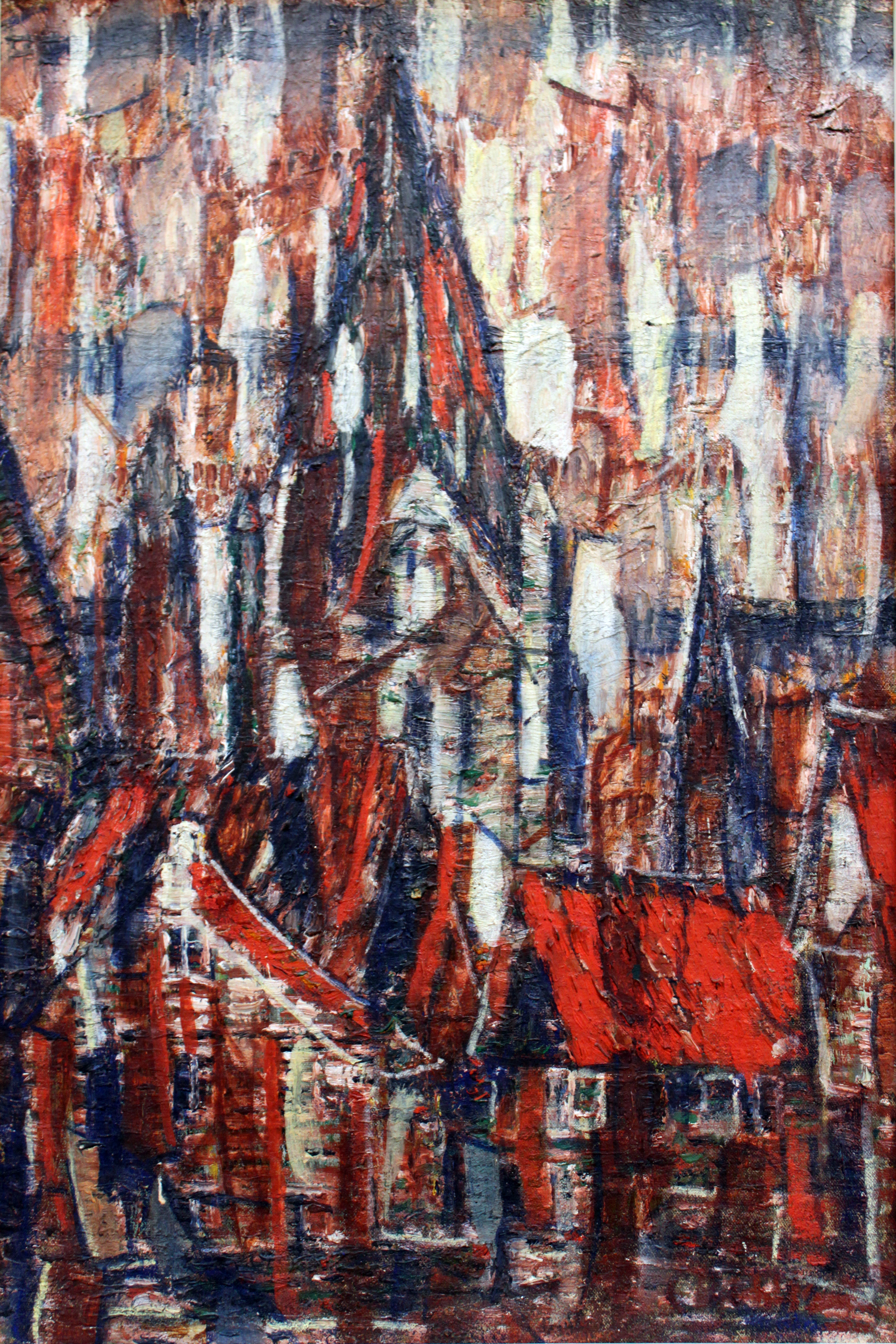
Collegiate Church of St. Patroclus in Soest, 1912, Germanisches Nationalmuseum

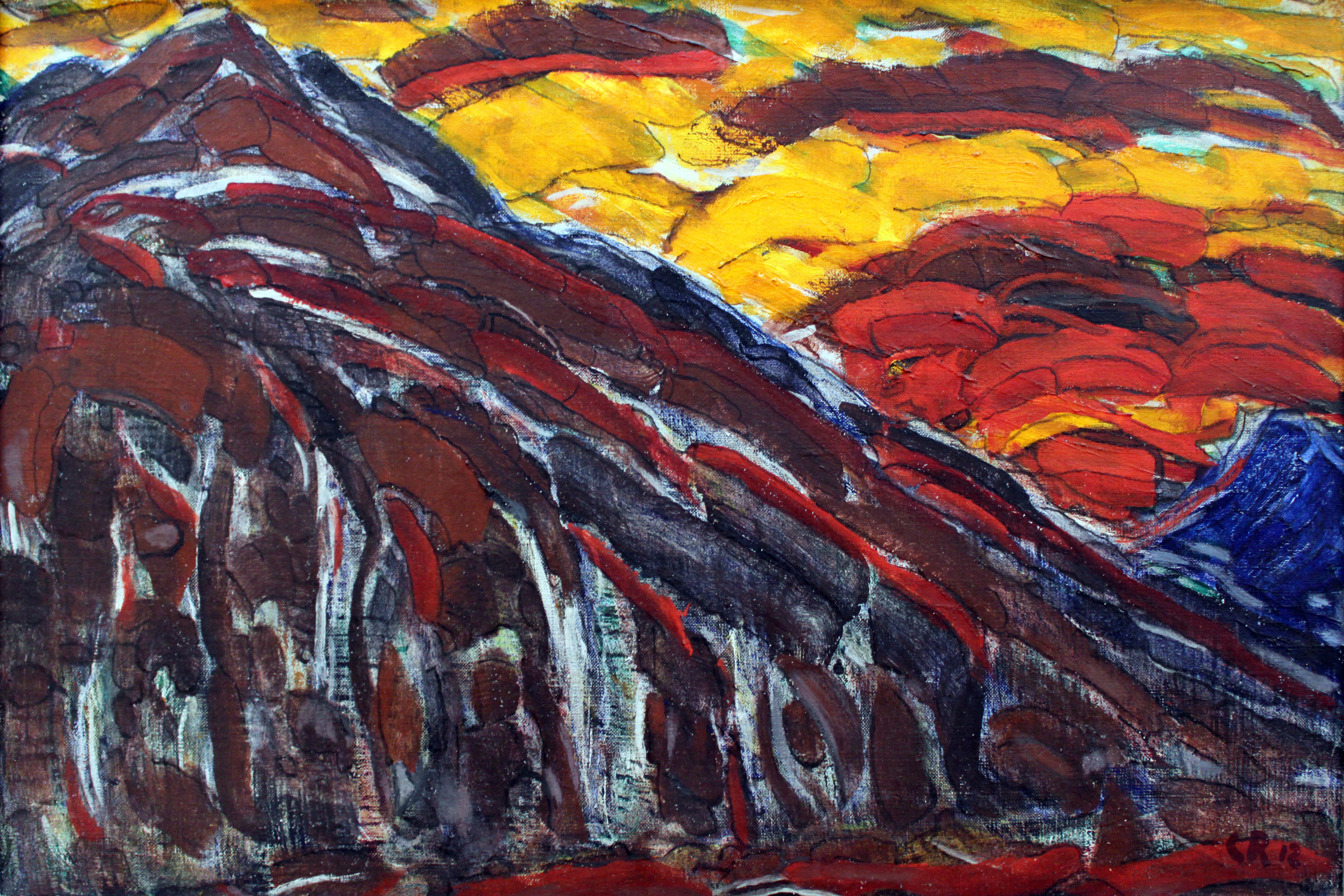
Landscape vision, 1912, Germanisches Nationalmuseum

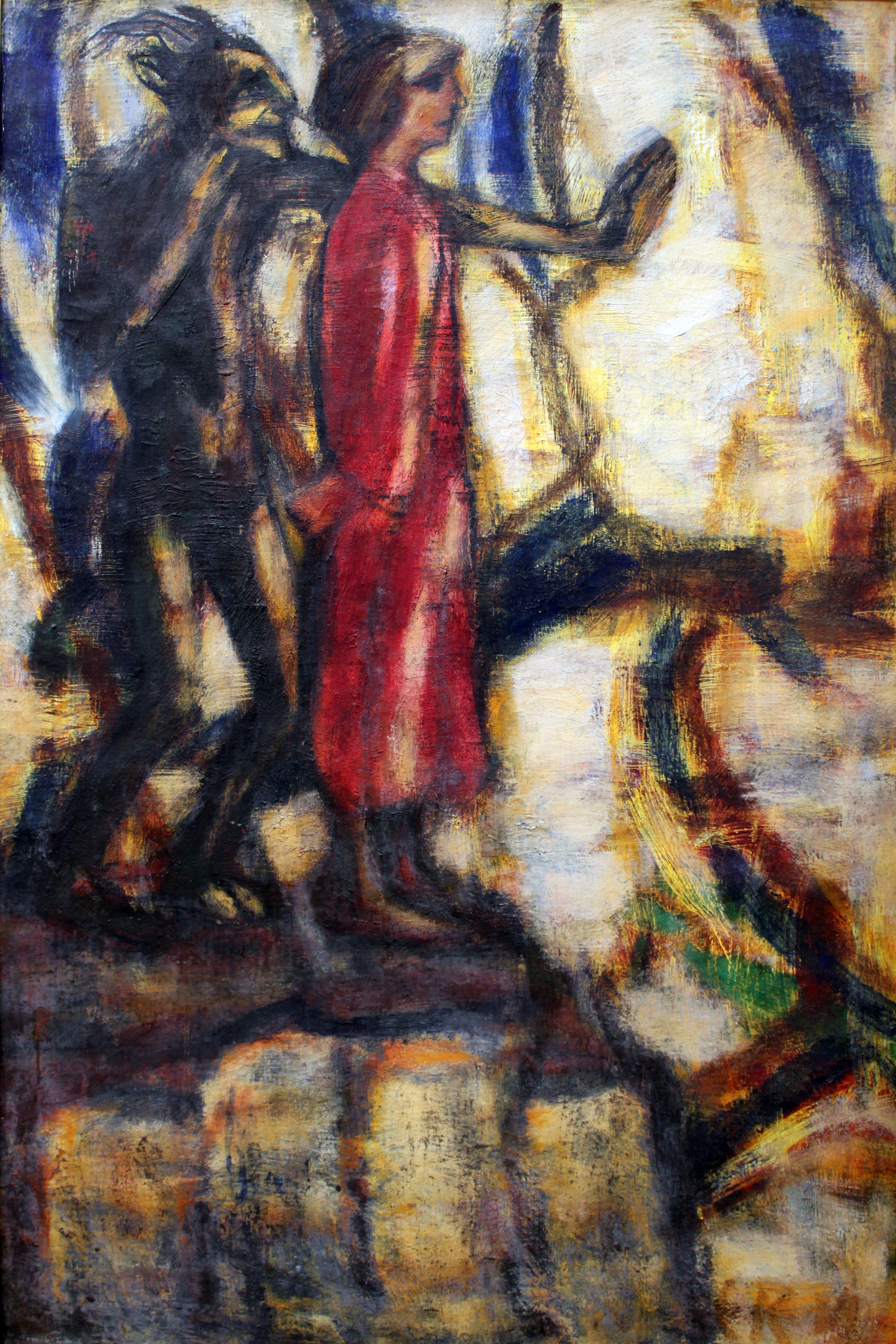
The temptation of Christ, 1914, Germanisches Nationalmuseum

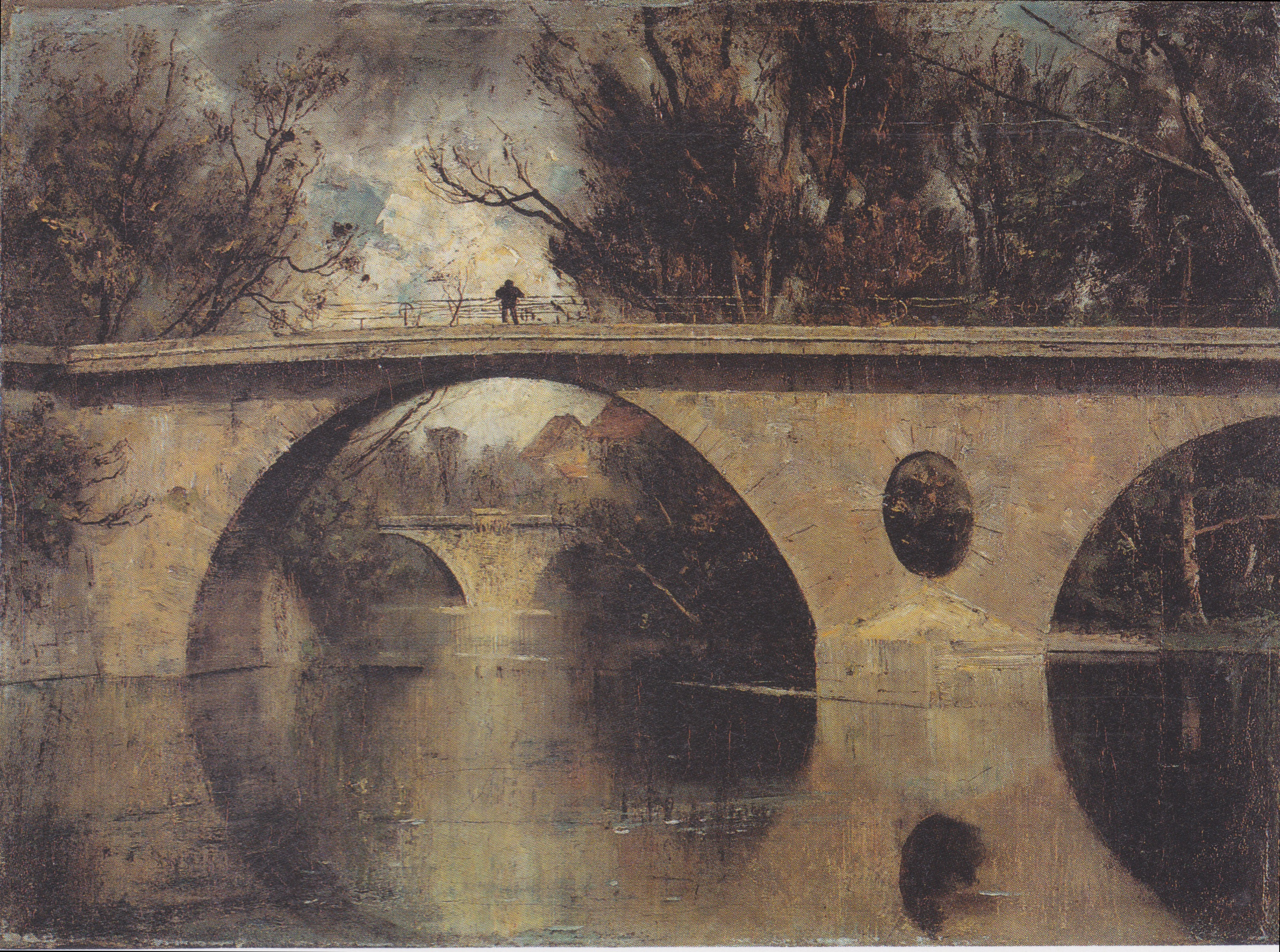
Sternbrücke in Weimar., (ca. 1917)
