= The Life of Christ (Nolde) =

Painting by Emil Nolde

- Das Leben Christi (German)
- Artist: Emil Nolde
- Year: 1911–1912
- Medium: Oil on canvas
- Movement: Expressionism
- Subject: Life of Christ
- Location: Nolde Stiftung Seebüll, Seebüll

The Life of Christ (German: Das Leben Christi) is a nine-part polyptych by the German Expressionist painter Emil Nolde, produced in 1911–1912. It is one of the main works of the artist's Christian-inspired religious paintings. It is held at the Nolde Stiftung Seebüll.

== Description ==
The work is an oil-on-canvas polyptych in nine parts, resembling an altarpiece, with four panels on the left in a square, and other four on the right, and a large central composition representing the Crucifixion. The flat areas of color are contrasting and strident, similar to the colors used by the Fauve painters.

In The Life of Christ, Nolde expressed his inner emotions with a strong religious feeling. He used a distorted aesthetic of strident colors applied with short, slurred, wiry brushstrokes.

Around the central panel of the Crucifixion, the Life of Christ is unfold in nine panels. From the Nativity, at the top left, it unfolds until the Ascension, at the top right, in the depiction of eight important episodes, illustrated by Nolde in a very personal style.

The logic of the panels follows the chronology of the main events of the story of the life of Christ. At the left, there are the Nativity, the Adoration of the Magi, the Twelve-Year-Old Christ, also known as Jesus among the Doctors, and Christ and Judas. At the center there is the main panel of the Crucifixion (Kreuzigung), and at the right, there are the panels depicting The Women at the Tomb, the Resurrection, the Ascension, and Doubting Thomas.

== History ==
Nolde first created three paintings, Twelve-Year-Old Christ, Christ and Judas and Adoration of the Magi, in 1911, as independent works. Subsequently, the idea of expanding these works into a polyptych was born.

The polyptych The Life of Christ has been featured in many art exhibitions. In March 1912 it was exhibited in Hagen as the centerpiece of an exhibition of works by Nolde. The polyptych was then to be presented at the 1912 International Exhibition of Contemporary Religious Art in Brussels, but two days before the opening it was refused because the jury deemed the altarpiece too "strong" and "dangerous ". The polyptych was then sent to the exhibition of the Sonderbund, in Cologne, but even there, under the pretext of lack of space, it was not allowed to participate.

The work was later exhibited in Munich as part of Paul Ferdinand Schmidt's New Art Salon, where it elicited mixed reactions from the public. After World War I, the polyptych was shown at several major exhibitions, including at the "Current Religious Art" exhibition, in Essen, in 1932, at the Museum Folkwang. The polyptych remained in Folkwang for several years, as Nolde's house did not have enough space to keep it.

In 1937 the National Socialists declared Nolde's work degenerate. The current polyptych was seized and transported to Munich for the “Degenerate Art” exhibition, which held more than 1000 works by Nolde. In 1939 the work was returned to the artist and was kept with him for a long time.

Today, the polyptych The Life of Christ is held in the museum of the Ada and Emil Nolde Foundation, in Seebüll.
