= Otto Siegfried Julius =

Otto Siegried Julius (also known as Fred Julius) was born in 1883 in Krojanke, West Prussia, German Empire.

He grew up with the Swiss archaeologist Robert Forrer (1866-1947) in Strasbourg. He married Lina Julius.

== Art collection ==
Otto Siegfried Julius owned antique, medieval and modern works of art, which he kept in his home. In addition to a Greek marble head, medieval sculptures, Renaissance furniture, ivory objects, bronze statuettes, carpets, porcelain and silver, he collected paintings by Nolde, Pechstein, Nesch, Bossányi, Modersohn-Becker, Daubigny and others, a sculpture by Kolbe and owned a large graphic art collection with works by Nesch, Modersohn Becker, Kolbe and Schmidt-Rottluff, and Toulouse-Lautrec). He was a major patron of Nolde. He also had a book collection. Most of his collections are considered lost today.

== Nazi persecution ==
When the Nazis came to power in 1933, Julius was persecuted due to his Jewish heritage even though he had converted to Christianity. A doctor, he was stripped of his medical license and his assets were frozen (30.09.1938) The Julius couple escaped Hamburg in 1938 and on February 1, 1939, they traveled from Basel first to Georgia and then at the end of 1939 to New York, where Julius' brother lived (14.09.1938).

Dr. Otto Siegried changed his name to Dr.Fred Julius. He died Oct 5, 1967.

== Restitution claims ==
In 2014, after a long struggle, his heirs were able to obtain the restitution an Emil Nolde painting from the Austrian city of Linz.
