= Blumengarten (Utenwarf) =

1917 painting by Emil Nolde

Blumengarten (Utenwarf ) is a flower painting from 1917 by Emil Nolde. It was purchased in 1967 by the Moderna Museet in Stockholm from Ketterer Gallery in Lugano, Switzerland.

The original owner was businessman Otto Nathan Deutsch, who fled from Frankfurt to Amsterdam just before the outbreak of World War II. The painting was then handed over to a German removal company, which later falsely claimed it had been destroyed in a bombing raid. Not knowing that the painting existed, in 1962, the heirs received some compensationfrom German authorities. Five years later it appeared for sale in Lugano. In the early 1990s, the heirs requested from the Moderna Museet that the painting be returned in accordance with the Washington Principles. The museum refused. This was the first case where these principles were tested in Sweden.

In a press release on September 9, 2009, Moderna Museet announced that it had reached an agreement between the museum and the heirs of Otto Nathan Deutsch regarding Blumengarten. The painting had been purchased by a private European collector and then loaned to Moderna Museet for up to five years. Under the agreement, after five years the Moderna Museet would be able to borrow further paintings for up to five years.
