= Groß Niendorf, Schleswig-Holstein =

Groß Niendorf
- Municipality
- Coat of arms

- Location of Groß Niendorf within Segeberg district
- Interactive map of Groß Niendorf
- Location within Germany Location within Schleswig-Holstein
- Coordinates: 53°51′N 10°15′E
- Country: Germany
- State: Schleswig-Holstein
- District: Segeberg
- Municipal assoc.: Leezen

Government
  - Mayor: Karl-Heinz Westphal

Area
  - Total: 10.68 km^{2} (4.12 sq mi)
- Elevation: 35 m (115 ft)

Population (2025-12-31)
  - Total: 643
  - Density: 60.2/km^{2} (156/sq mi)
- Time zone: UTC+01:00 (CET)
  - Summer (DST): UTC+02:00 (CEST)
- Postal codes: 23816
- Dialling codes: 04552
- Vehicle registration: SE
- Website: www.gross-niendorf.de

Groß Niendorf is a municipality in the district of Segeberg, in Schleswig-Holstein, Germany.

== Notable people ==
- Christian Rohlfs (1849-1938), German painter

== Points of interest ==
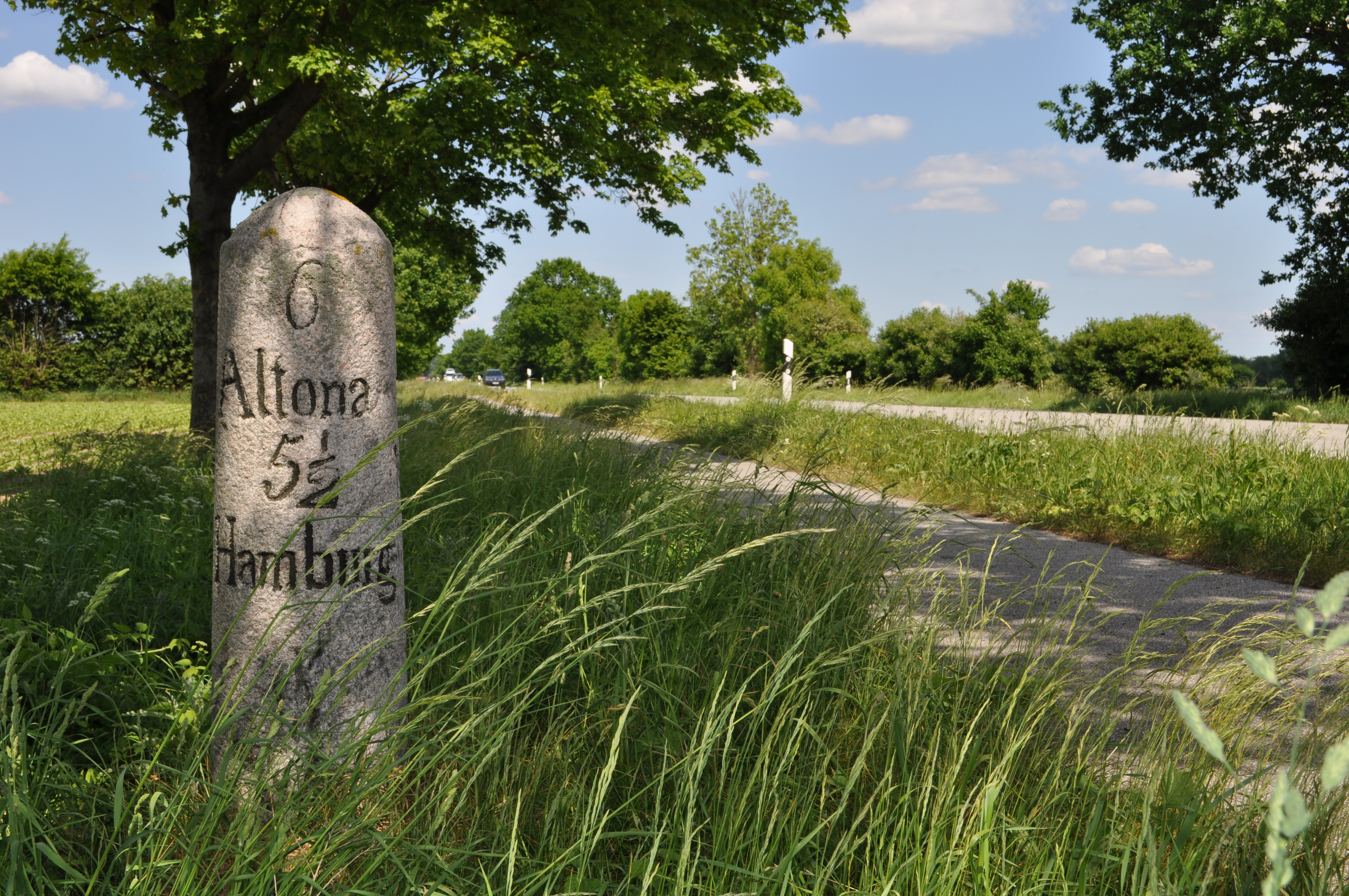
Der Altona-Neustädter Chaussee in Groß-Niendorf
