= Curt Schueler =

Polish-Jewish art collector (1877-1962)

Curt Schueler was a Polish Jewish art collector (1877–1962).

== Early life ==
Curt Schueler was born on 15 November 1877 in Wronke, in the province of Posen. From 1897 he lived in Berlin, where he worked for and later became a co-owner of Siegmund Michalski, one of Berlin's most respected timber companies.

== Art collection ==
Schueler's art collection inclucled works by Jules Pascin, Franz Marc, Willy Jaeckel, Bruno Krauskopf, Paul Kleinschmidt, Emil Nolde as well as many paintings by Franz Heckendorf, a childhood friend whom he supported as a patron.

== Nazi era ==
In 1934, Schueler's business was boycotted as part of the Nazi persecution of Jewish businesses and in 1938 it was banned completely by the Berlin-Charlottenburg district office. Without income, to survive and finance his unsuccessful attempt to escape from Nazi Germany with his wife, he was forced to sell artworks from his collection. Despite "many attempts” (LABO, Reg. No. 73.010, Curt and Hilda Schueler, affidavit dated 21 August 1956). the Schuelers initially remained in Berlin, where they had to perform forced labor. In 1942, Hilda and Curt Schueler received a deportation order. However, they escaped to Sweden.

== Postwar claims for looted art ==
In 2019 the City of Düsseldorf agreed to restitute a painting by Emil Nolde to the Schueler heirs. The painting had previously been in the Kunstpalast. The Schuelers had been forced to sell it due to Nazi persecution. Two paintings by Lovis Corinth, "Sterbender Krieger" and "Schale mit Apfelsinen" were the object of restitution settlements in 2022. The Schuelers continue to search for 31 paintings lost due to Nazi persecution and have registered these on the German Lost Art Foundation's Lostart database.

== See also ==
- Aryanization
- The Holocaust
- Nazi Germany
