= John Christian Jacobson =

Moravian bishop

John Christian Jacobson (April 8, 1795 – November 24, 1870) was a Moravian bishop in the United States.

== Early life and education ==
Jacobson was born at the parish of Burkal in Tønder, Denmark. His parents were both missionaries of the Moravian Church in Denmark. He was educated at the Mission Institute in Niesky, the college and the theological seminary of the Moravian Church in Saxony.

== Career ==
In 1816, he came to the United States, and filled various offices in Nazareth, Pennsylvania. Four years later he was made professor at the theological seminary in Bethlehem, Pennsylvania. In 1834, he was appointed principal of the female academy at Salem, North Carolina. He met with great success, building up that school until it became one of the best known and most prosperous girls' schools in the southern United States. Subsequently, he took charge of a boys' boarding school at Nazareth, Pennsylvania. On 20 September 1854, he was consecrated to the episcopacy, and stood at the head of the northern district of the church until 1867, when he retired.

== Death ==
On November 24, 1870, he died in Bethlehem, Pennsylvania, at age 75.
