= Unpainted Paintings =

Series of paintings by Emil Nolde

Unpainted Paintings is a series of small-format watercolor-based paintings by German painter Emil Nolde, who gave them this title. He created these 1300 paintings between 1938 and 1945.

== Context ==
Despite the fact that Nolde was a member of the NSDAP-Nordschleswig and he openly supported the National Socialist politics and ideology, his work increasingly aroused the displeasure of the cultural politicians of the time. He had a large number of paintings shown in the defamation exhibition of Degenerate Art, in 1937. Nolde was expelled from the Reich Chamber of Culture in 1941 and banned from working. He later presented this incorrectly as a ban on painting. In his own words: “When this ban on painting and selling arrived, I was amid the most beautiful, most productive paintings. The brushes slipped from my hands. (...) With a sword hanging over my head, I was deprived of movement and freedom”.

As early as 1938 Nolde had started to paint watercolors in small formats. These paintings were "unpainted" in several ways. On one hand, since he was banned from working in 1941, he was no longer allowed to exhibit them in public, and on the other hand, because Nolde planned to convert later these sheets into large-format oil paintings, so they had not yet been painted according to his intention. Contrary to what he himself stated, there is no evidence of planned house searches to enforce the alleged ban on painting. Many of these works were given to friends for safekeeping. His NSDAP party friend and painter Otto Andreas Schreiber, among others, provided him with painting materials during this time.

== The paintings ==
Although Nolde's Unpainted Paintings were painted with watercolors, they are not actually watercolors. They were created using mixed media. He used the watercolor paint as the basis, which was applied to easily absorbent Japanese paper, that he had in large quantities. On the top of the watercolor basis he put another layer of gouache and ink outlines.

The close, personal circle in which these paintings were created shaped his working style and the choice of his means. With a free stroke, the brush soaked in color, he applied them to the paper in different layers and by this way was able to achieve the highest color intensity. He often painted several times over individual areas, sometimes he also painted the reverse side of the sheet, so that his colors began to radiate profoundly and achieved a high density presence. In addition, he left out some areas in order to emphasize the structure of the paper and set accents with partly dry pigments or cut up older works on paper in order to recolor them in completely different forms. With opaque white and tempera paint, he set accents, emphasized details and gave individual parts of the picture a special impact.

Nolde, who was over 70 at the time, with the Unpainted Paintings, comprising around 1300 works, created a rich later work that is still characterized by an extraordinary freshness and topicality. Like Manfred Reuther stated: "The influence of Nolde's work, especially that of the Unpainted Paintings, on art after 1945, extends with the same force to the artistic endeavors of the most recent present."
