= Otto Nathan Deutsch =

Otto Nathan Deutsch (died 1943) was a Jewish art collector and refugee from Nazis.

== Early life ==
Otto Nathan Deutsch was a German Jewish art collector. He was married to Bertha Deutsch.

== Nazi persecution ==
Facing persecution by the Nazis because of their Jewish heritage, Otto Nathan and Bertha Deutsch fled Frankfurt in 1939 to Amsterdam. The inventory of their possessions was used by the Nazis to select the objects they wanted. The couple died during the war, Otto Nathan in 1943.

== Restitution claims for artworks ==
In 1978, the Deutsch family learned that a painting that had been thought destroyed had survived the war. The painting “Blumengarten (Utenwarf)” by Emil Nolde surfaced in Switzerland in 1967 at the Roman Norbert Ketterer auction house where it was acquired by the Swedish museum, Moderna Museet, The family requested that the Stockholm museum return the painting, setting off a long court battle.

In 2006 the heirs of Otto Nathan Deutsch and the Moderna Museet in Stockholm, Sweden reached a settlement concerning the 1917 Emil Nolde painting Blumengarten (Utenwarf) after a dispute lasting seven years. Another Nolde painting, Mohn und Rosen, which had ended up in a private collection, was restituted to the Deutsch heirs in 2021. It had passed through the Galerie Kornfeld in Bern in 2006.

The German Lost Art Foundation Database lists 18 works missing from the Deutsch collection, included art by Emil Nolde, Max Liebermann, August Humbert, Richard Kaiser and Charles Camoin.

== See also ==
- The Holocaust
- List of claims for restitution for Nazi-looted art
