= Dance Around the Golden Calf =

Painting by Emil Nolde

- Artist: Emil Nolde
- Year: 1910
- Medium: Oil on canvas
- Dimensions: 87.5 cm × 105 cm (34.4 in × 41 in)
- Location: Pinakothek der Moderne; Munich

Dance Around the Golden Calf is an oil-on-canvas painting by German-Danish painter Emil Nolde, created in 1910. It is held at the Pinakothek der Moderne, in Munich.

== History and description ==
Nolde took an interest for religious inspired works shortly before making this canvas and would create several Biblical themed paintings. This work depicts an event from the book of Exodus, when the Israelites believing that Moses might not return from Mount Sinai, created a golden calf to represent the God that had taken them from Egypt and worshipped them. Nolde took inspiration from this episode to create a work where the main protagonists, depicted in the foreground, are several women, naked or half-naked, who appear dancing franticly and lustfully, and without any moral, to celebrate the pagan idol. The colors chosen by Nolde echo those of fauvism, and also of Post-Impressionist painters Vincent van Gogh and Paul Gauguin. The primitivism of the work seems to be reminiscent of Gauguin in particular.

Kay Larson states that the painting "exhibits deep emotional complexity. The women flinging up their heels in the picture's center are meant to be wanton and lustful; their skirts rise high above their thighs, yet the revelers seem oblivious to the gazes of male onlookers."
