= Nolde Stiftung Seebüll =

Museum in Seebüll, Schleswig-Holstein

Coordinates: 54°53′02.6″N 08°46′25.0″E

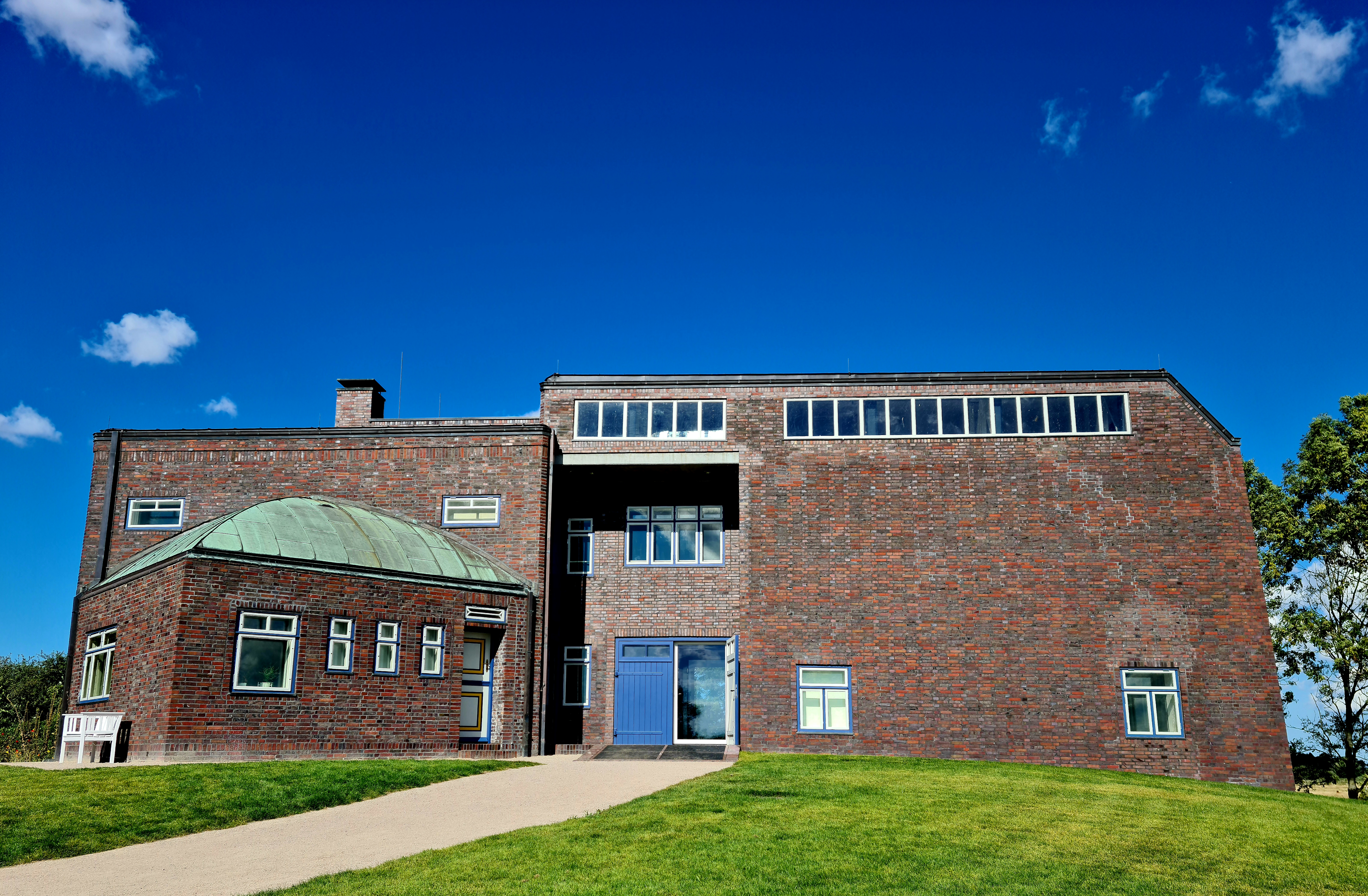
The Nolde Stiftung Seebüll museum

The Nolde Stiftung Seebüll, also known as Stiftung Seebüll Ada und Emil Nolde, in English, the Nolde Foundation Seebüll, or the Seebüll Ada and Emil Nolde Foundation, is a foundation established in 1956, who is the sponsor of an art museum in Seebüll, in Schleswig-Holstein, dedicated to the life and works of the German painter Emil Nolde. The museum was opened in 1957, after Nolde's death, by the Seebüll Ada and Emil Nolde Foundation.

== History ==
The couple Emil and Ada Nolde acquired the mound in 1926 and had a brick house built there, which was modeled on the Bauhaus architecture and thus deliberately different from the surrounding Frisian houses. The Noldes lived in the house since 1930. Other buildings and a garden created according to Nolde's designs were subsequently made. After Nolde's death in 1956, the house was turned into a museum. In 1996 the house and garden were placed under monument protection.

== The buildings ==
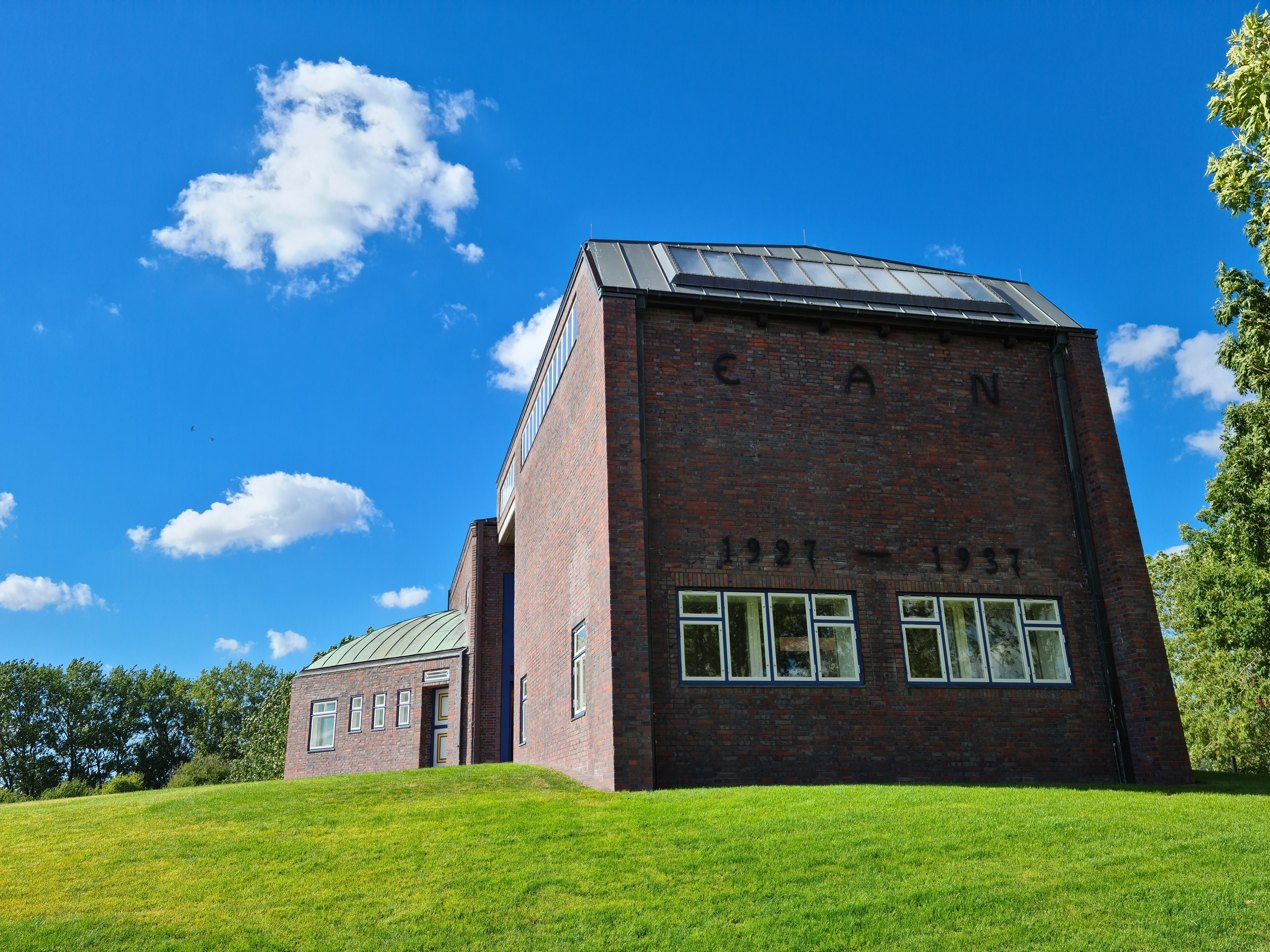
View of the museum, with the windows of the former studio visible, after complete renovation, in 2022

The Noldes' house at Seebüll 31 was a two-story cube with one-story extension and a triangular floor plan. It was built according to Nolde's ideas between 1927 and 1928 with the participation of the architect Georg Rieve, as both a studio and a residential building, It would be expanded in 1934-1937 to include a painting gallery. There are skylights in the flat roof. Nowadays the former studio on the ground floor is part of the exhibition area and contains a painting room. A few years after Nolde's death, five rather rough-looking buildings, compared to Nolde's house, were erected on the site because of the increasing space requirements of the foundation. These structurally unsatisfactory and technically inadequate buildings were demolished in the course of the reorganization of the entire area that began in 2004. In its place, two architecturally sophisticated buildings for the forum and the office were built in the following years, southwest of the studio, according to plans by the architects commissioned by the foundation, led by Walter Rolfes. In the forum, among other things, are displayed testimonies from Nolde's life; there is also a café and a museum shop. The Kontor is the seat of the foundation with a library and offices. The third new building at that time was a ground-level building, which serves as a greenhouse and offers to the public plants and seeds from their own cultivation. The museum reopened in August 2022, after extensive renovation works.

== The garden ==
The garden is an individual work of art designed by Nolde himself and follows the contemporary reform movement, which was directed against industrial and standardized art forms. In terms of planting and furnishings, it was created a fairly closed, home-related cottage garden, even if it does not have a central axis related to the house, which is typical for these gardens, and the house and the garden form separate units. The paths in the central part of the garden form the letters A and E standing for the names of Ada and Emil. The garden also includes the thatched garden house, which Nolde called Seebüllchen, a pond and the burial place of Ada and Emil Nolde. On the front wall of the crypt is Nolde's mosaic of the Madonna and Child. Nolde's gardener Thomas Börnsen tended the garden until 1976. He left behind a planting plan that made it possible to maintain and care for the garden in the spirit of Nolde until the present.

== Collection and events ==
The collection consists mostly of works by Emil Nolde, especially paintings and watercolors, from all the phases of his work. Nolde himself also collected works by other artists. A part of the collection is exhibited with a different focus every year. The works are arranged thematically. In the former artists studio, for example, religiously are shown religiously inspired pictures, including the nine-parts altar work The Life of Christ (1911-1912). Some of the Noldes' former living quarters have been preserved in their original condition. The museum received a major donation of 36 works by Nolde, and also a watercolor by Karl Schmidt-Rottluff, as well as the correspondence between both painters, from the Hermann Gerlinger collection, a renowned expert in the Die Brücke painters, in 2022.

Other events that take place in the museum include performances of chamber music and the work of a painting school. The museum is open daily from March 1 to October 31 of every year. In 2010, it had around 80,000 visitors.

A branch of the museum that existed in Berlin, where Nolde also lived for a long time, at Jägerstraße 55, was closed on March 30, 2014.

== See also ==
- The Life of Christ
