= The Last Supper (Crespi) =

Painting by Daniele Crespi

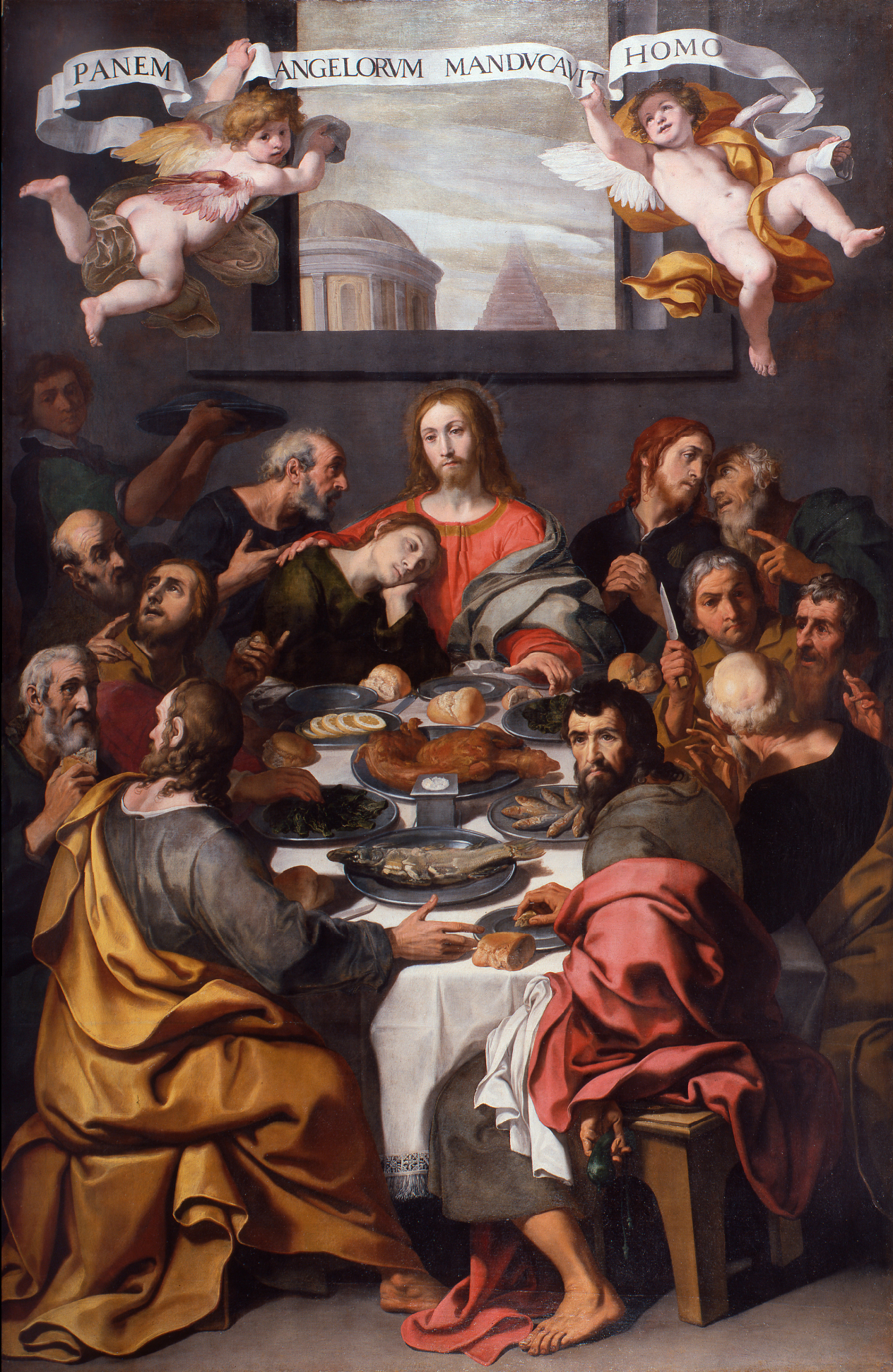
Daniele Crespi, The Last Supper (Pinacoteca di Brera, Milan)

The Last Supper is a painting by Daniele Crespi.

This depiction of the last meal that Jesus Christ took with his disciples was painted in 1624-25 for the Benedictine monastery at Brugora (Brianza). The composition is based on that of Gaudenzio Ferrari (painted 1541-42), located in the Santa Maria della Passione, Milan.
