= The Last Supper (Nolde) =

Painting by Emil Nolde

- Artist: Emil Nolde
- Year: 1909
- Medium: Oil on canvas
- Dimensions: 86 cm × 107 cm (34 in × 42 in)
- Location: National Gallery of Denmark, Copenhagen

The Last Supper is an oil-on-canvas painting by Danish German painter Emil Nolde, created in 1909. It is held in the National Gallery of Denmark, in Copenhagen.

== History ==
Nolde came from a Protestant family, but it was only after surviving a serious case of poisoning that he became interested in the making of Christian-inspired paintings. This painting marks the start of a new phase in his career. In this case, he depicts the Last Supper, a traditional theme in paintings dealing with the life of Christ, but here in a very personal way.

== Description ==
Nolde adopts an expressionist approach, presenting Jesus and the Apostles around a table in the Last Supper, but with the use of expressive colours and ignoring entirely the surrounding space. The painting focus more in its characters and their psychological state. Jesus is at the center, with eyes closed, while holding the cup in His hands. Dressed in red and white, his yellow face and serene expression seems to anticipate the events of his passion. The Apostles surround him in an unusual closeness, each with different expressions. They aren't easily identifiable and their iconography is far from that traditionally adopted in Christian art. Judas Iscariot on Jesus' right, looks to outside the scene, as if he does not belong there.

Tuan Hong states that "Rather than a variety of reactions, the painting shows unity and communion among the apostles, whose faces turn towards Jesus while sharing a similar expression. (Situated on the upper left side, Judas is the only one that looks away from the center.) Besides the cramped space among Jesus and the apostles, Nolde reinforces their companionship by showing one apostle extending his hand to another while a third apostle wraps his arm around the shoulder of the second. The followers of Jesus need one another as much as they need him."

H. W. Janson, in his History of Art, highlights the current painting as representative of Nolde's style, and mentions the influences of Paul Gauguin and primitive art, along with its similarities to James Ensor's depiction of masks, and the sculpture of Ernst Barlach.

== Provenance ==
The painting was acquired by the Halle Museum, in 1912, not without controversy, but it was purged during the Nazi campaign against degenerate art and exhibited in the following exhibition in 1937. Nolde eventually was able to recover the painting and it remained in his possession for the following years. He left it in his last will to the National Gallery of Denmark, where it still remains.
