= Burkal =

Village in Denmark

Coordinates: 54°55′2″N 9°4′12″E

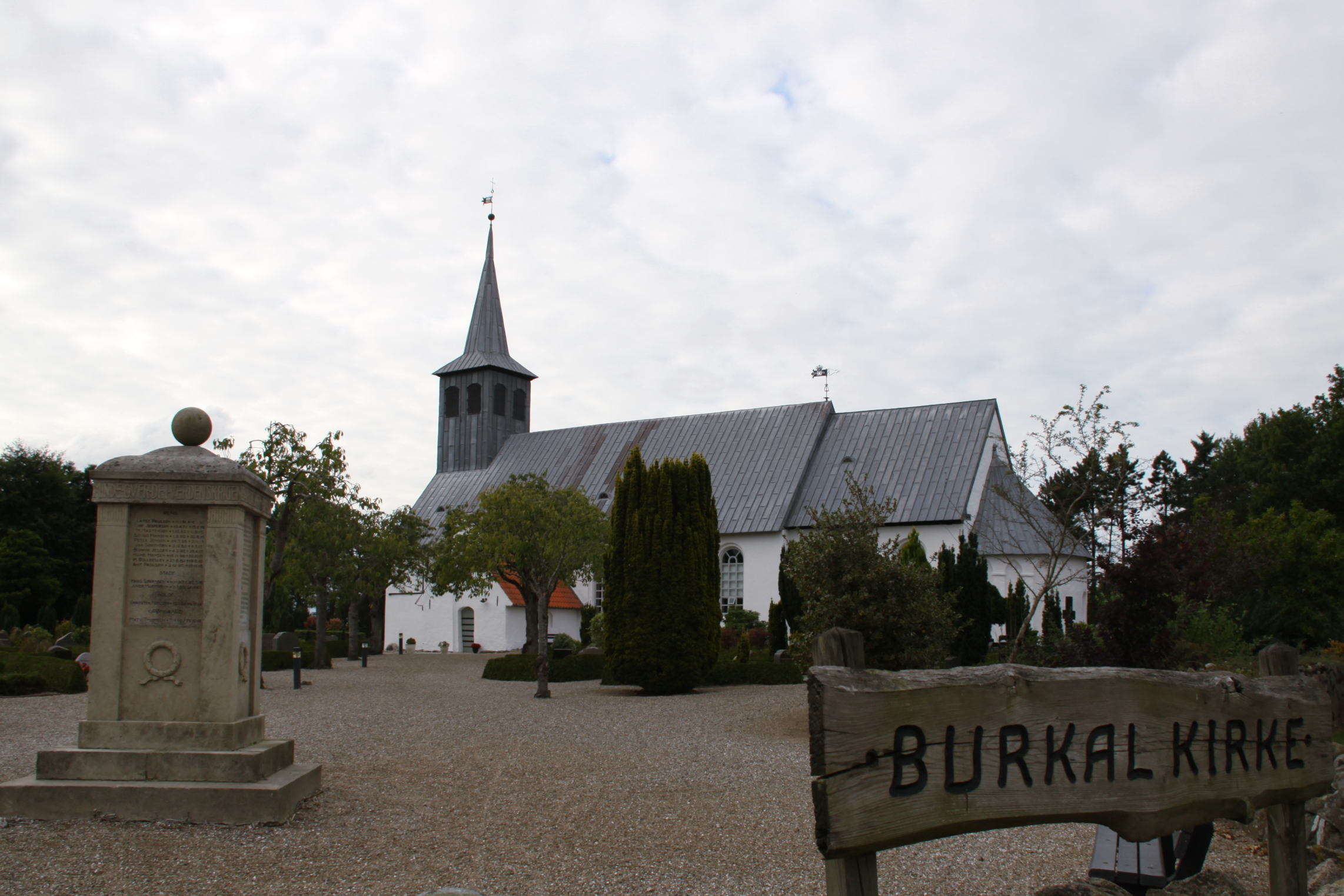
Burkal Church

Burkal (German: Buhrkall) is a small village in the Aabenraa Municipality, Southern Jutland, Denmark.
