= Emil Nolde =

German painter (1867–1956)

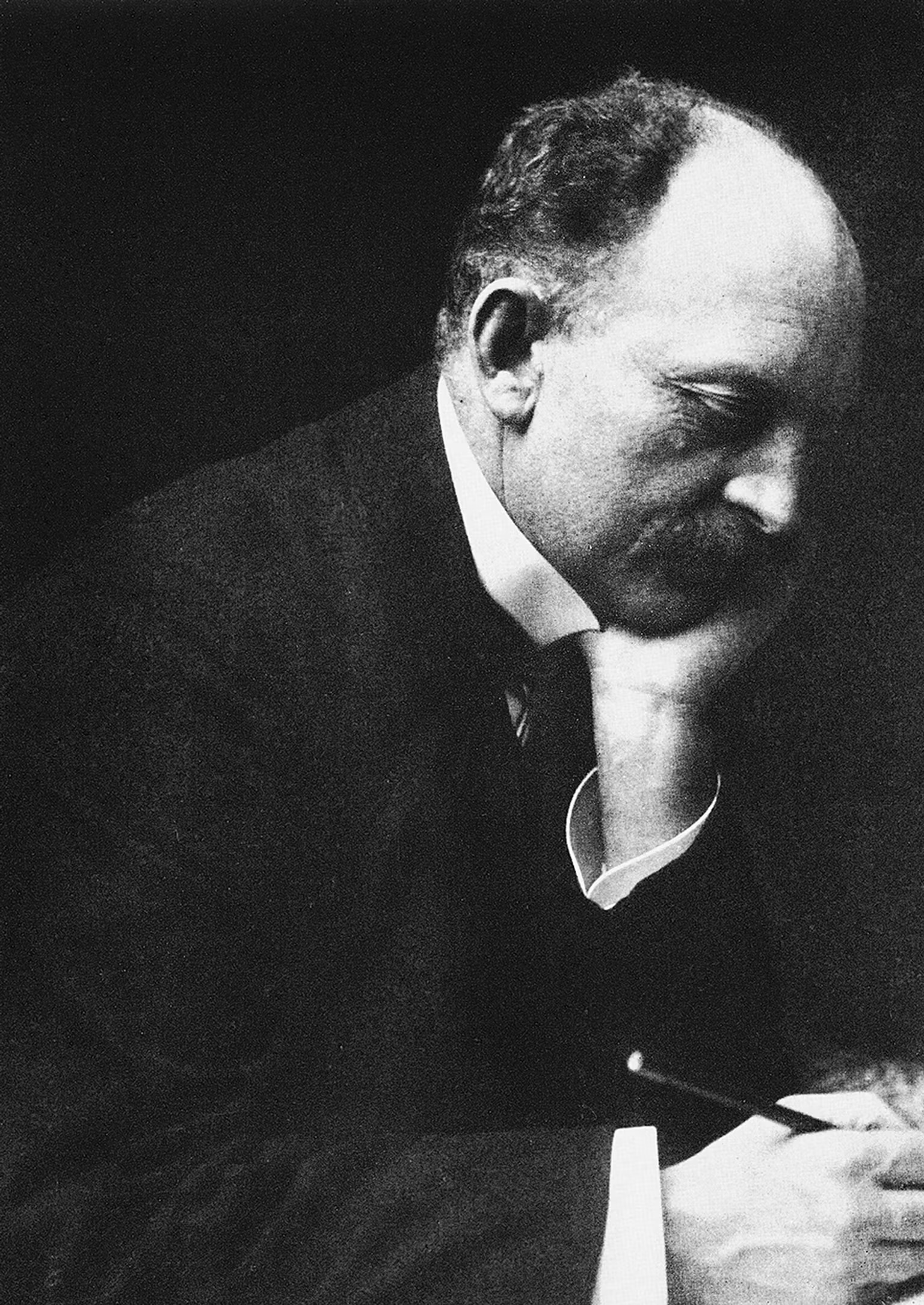
- Nolde in 1929
- Born: Hans Emil Hansen; 7 August 1867; Nolde, Province of Schleswig-Holstein, Kingdom of Prussia, North German Confederation (modern-day Denmark)
- Died: 13 April 1956 (aged 88); Seebüll, Schleswig-Holstein, West Germany (modern-day Germany)
- Known for: Painting, printmaking
- Notable work: The Life of Christ (1911–12)
- Movement: Expressionism

Signature
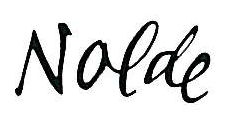

Emil Nolde (born Hans Emil Hansen; 7 August 1867 – 13 April 1956) was a German painter and printmaker. He was one of the first Expressionists, a member of Die Brücke, and was one of the first oil painting and watercolor painters of the early 20th century to explore color. He is known for his brushwork and expressive choice of colors. Golden yellows and deep reds appear frequently in his work, giving a luminous quality to otherwise somber tones. His watercolors include vivid, brooding storm-scapes and brilliant florals.

Nolde's intense preoccupation with the subject of flowers reflected his interest in the art of Vincent van Gogh.

Even though his art was included in the Entartete Kunst exhibition of 1937, Nolde was a member of the Nazi Party, with racist and antisemitic views, and a staunch supporter of Nazi Germany.

== Early life ==
Emil Nolde was born as Hans Emil Hansen, near the village of Nolde (since 1920 part of the municipality of Burkal in Southern Jutland, Denmark), in the Duchy of Schleswig. He grew up on a farm. His parents, devout Protestants, were Danish and Frisian peasants. He realized his unsuitability for farm life, and that he and his three brothers were not at all alike.

Between 1884 and 1891, he studied to become a woodcarver and illustrator in Flensburg, and worked in furniture factories as a young adult. He spent his years of travel in Munich, Karlsruhe and Berlin. In 1889, he gained entrance into the School of Applied Arts in Karlsruhe. He was a drawing instructor at the school of the Museum of Industrial and Applied Arts (Industrie- und Gewerbemuseum; today the Textilmuseum, or Textile Museum) in St. Gallen, Switzerland, from 1892 to 1898. He eventually left this job to finally pursue his dream of becoming an independent artist.

== Career ==
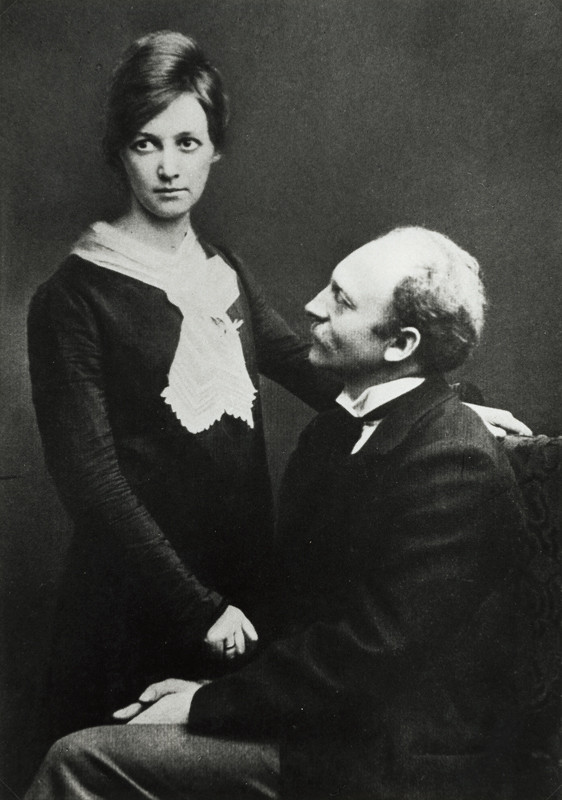
Ada and Emil, wedding photograph, 1902

As a child, he had loved to paint and draw; however, he was already 31 by the time he pursued this new career. When he was rejected by the Munich Academy of Fine Arts in 1898, he spent the next three years taking private painting classes, visiting Paris, and becoming familiar with the contemporary impressionist scene that was popular at this time. In 1902 he married Danish actress Ada Vilstrup (1879–1946) and moved to Berlin, where he would meet collector Gustav Schiefler and artist Karl Schmidt-Rottluff, both of whom would advocate his work later in life. From that year, he named himself after his birthplace.

He became a member of the revolutionary expressionist group Die Brücke (The Bridge), of Dresden, in 1906, upon the group's invitation. This association lasted only until the end of the following year. He was a member of the Berlin Secession from 1908 to 1910, but was then excluded owing to a disagreement with the leadership. In Berlin, Nolde was strongly influenced by the collections of the Völkerkundemuseum in what was then Königgrätzer Straße, which he visited repeatedly and where he made over 120 drawings of exhibits from the Global South. His studies resulted in works such as Man, Woman and Cat (1912), in which Nolde depicted King Njoya's throne “Mandu Yenu”, which came to Germany from Cameroon under controversial circumstances, only slightly altered. He exhibited with Wassily Kandinsky's Munich-based group Der Blaue Reiter (The Blue Rider) in 1912; by this time he had achieved some fame, and was able to support himself through his art.

== Politics ==
Nolde was a supporter of the National Socialist German Workers' Party from the early 1920s, having become a member of its Danish section. He expressed anti-semitic, negative opinions about Jewish artists, and considered Expressionism to be a distinctively Germanic style. This view was shared by some other members of the Nazi party, notably Joseph Goebbels and Fritz Hippler.

== Degenerate art ==
However, Adolf Hitler rejected all forms of modernism as "degenerate art"; the Nazi regime officially condemned Nolde's work. Until that time, he had been held in great esteem in Germany. A total of 1,052 of his works were removed from museums, more than those of any other artist. Some were included in the Entartete Kunst exhibition of 1937, despite his protests, including (later) a personal appeal to Nazi Gauleiter Baldur von Schirach in Vienna. He was not allowed to paint—even in private—after 1941. Nevertheless, during this period he created hundreds of watercolors. He called them the "Unpainted Pictures".

In 1942, Nolde wrote:

There is silver blue, sky blue and thunder blue. Every color holds within it a soul, which makes me happy or repels me, and which acts as a stimulus. To a person who has no art in him, colors are colors, tones tones...and that is all. All their consequences for the human spirit, which range between heaven to hell, just go unnoticed.

== Post war ==
After World War II, Nolde was once again honoured, receiving the Pour le Mérite.

While acknowledging his success as a brilliant colourist, greater awareness of Nolde's commitment to Nazism and a discussion of the relationship between his politics, denunciation of non-Jewish adversaries as Jews, and his art is considered in more recent scholarship. A recent exhibition (Emile Nolde: A German Legend, The Artist during the Nazi Regime, Berlin National Gallery, 2019) examined Nolde's self-professed Nazi leanings, and the tendency of postwar art historians to downplay them.

Nolde's first wife Ada died in November 1946. Two years later he married Jolanthe Erdmann (1921–2010) the daughter of the composer and pianist Eduard Erdmann.

== Death ==
He died in Seebüll, now part of Neukirchen, in 1956. The Nolde Stiftung Seebüll (The Nolde Foundation at Seebull) was created the same year and opened a museum dedicated to his life and work in 1957.

== Body of work ==
Apart from paintings, Nolde's work includes many prints, often in color, and watercolor paintings of varied subjects (landscapes, religious images, flowers, stormy seas and scenes from Berlin nightlife). A famous series of paintings covers the German New Guinea Expedition, visiting the South Seas, Moscow, Siberia, Korea, Japan, and China. The Schiefler catalogue raisonné of his prints describes 231 etchings, 197 woodcuts, 83 lithographs, and four hectographs. He named a wartime series of 1300 works in watercolor on Japanese paper "Unpainted Paintings", made in the shadow of Hitler's decree.

== Religious motifs ==
The Life of Christ, 1911–12

Although religious images make up a relatively small part of Nolde's artistic oeuvre, he considered some to be "milestones" with respect to his progression as an artist.

Nolde, who grew up a farmer's son in a small, religious community near the German-Danish border, was left with lasting impressions of Judeo-Christian stories after reading the Bible in its entirety. In his early religious works (1900–1904), he was unable to solidify his own style and distinguish himself from several role models, Jean-François Millet and Honoré Daumier.

Nolde experienced a turning point in 1906; in that year, he shifted from an impressionistic style to a depiction of religious themes that emphasized the emotion of the moment, use of bright colors and only two dimensions of representation. This new devotion to religious artwork was hastened by a near death experience in 1909 after drinking poisoned water at the age of 42. After 1911 Nolde's religious treatments—now including etchings—became darker and more ominous in tone than his previous works. Even his wife, Ada, was unnerved by his bold vision. In response to his nine-part The Life of Christ, she wrote in a letter: "For the first few days I was only able to take a furtive peek now and then, so strong was the effect."

== Gallery ==
"South Sea Islander" South Sea Islander (Südsee-Insulaner II), lithograph in colors, on wove paper, Brooklyn Museum, 1915.

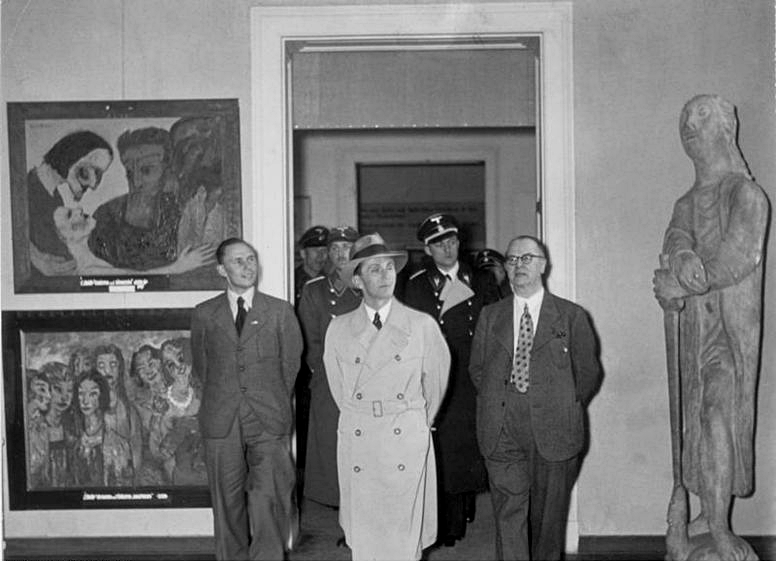
Photo of the Degenerate Art Exhibition in Haus der Kunst visited by Goebbels with two of Nolde's paintings (hanging left of the door), in Feb. 1938.

"The Prophet", woodcut, 1912.

The Last Supper, oil on canvas, 1909, National Gallery of Denmark, Copenhagen.

Dance Around the Golden Calf, oil on canvas, 1910, Pinakothek der Moderne, Munich.

The Burial (Die Grablegung), oil on canvas, 1915, Stiftung Nolde, Seebüll.

"Wildly Dancing Children," oil on canvas, 1909.

"Flower Garden" (without figure) (Blumengarten, ohne Figur), oil painting on canvas, 1908.

"Head with Pipe (Self Portrait)," lithograph, 1907.

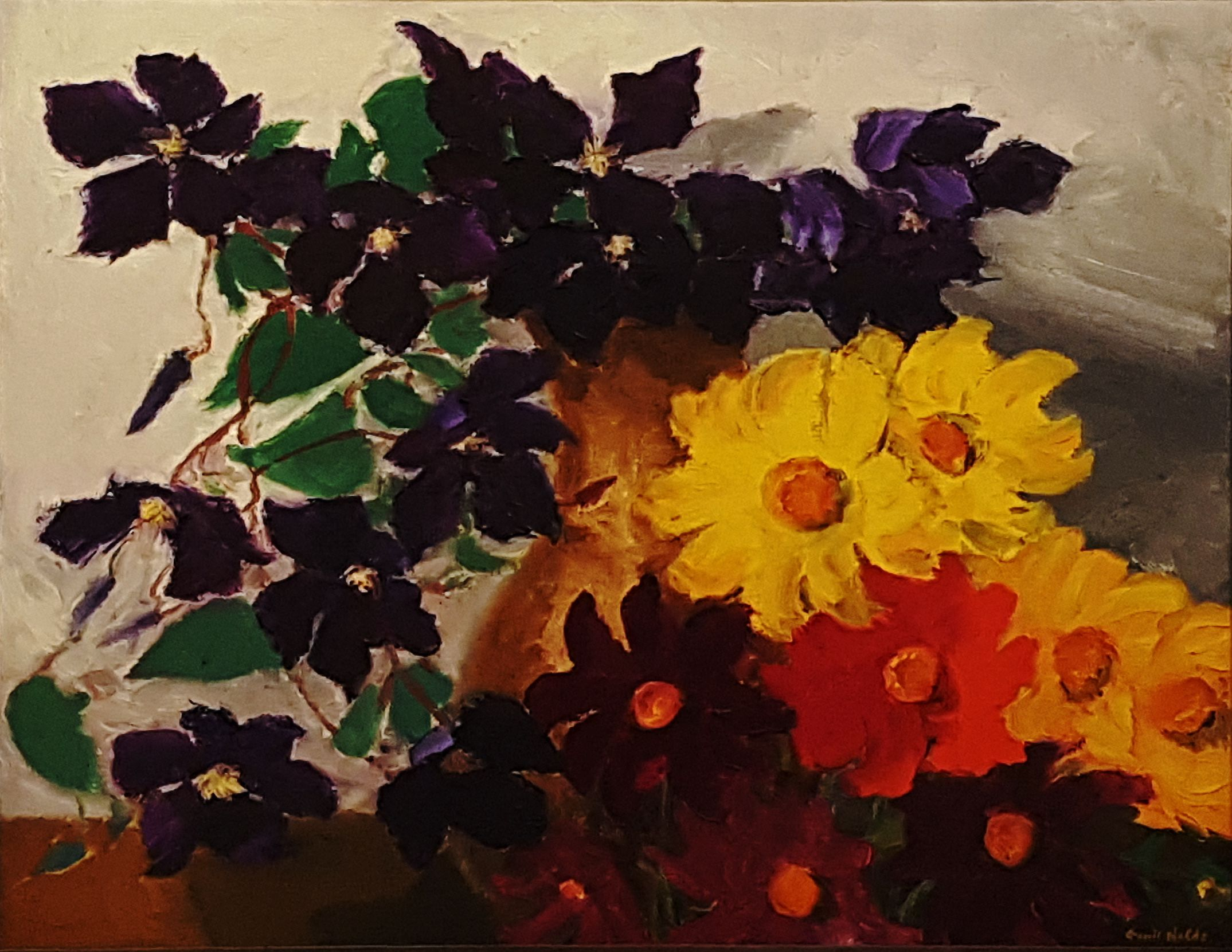
"Clematis and Dahlia", 1940.

== Major works ==
Nolde's work is exhibited at major museums around the world, including Portrait of a Young Woman and a Child, Portrait of a Man (c. 1926), and Portrait of a Young Girl (1913–1914) at the Hermitage Museum, Saint Petersburg, Russia; and Prophet (1921) and Young Couple (1913) at the Museum of Modern Art, New York City. His most important print, The Prophet (1912), is an icon of 20th-century art.

Among his most important oils are Lesende junge Frau (1906), Blumengarten (ohne Figur) (1908), and Blumen und Wolken (1933).

Other important works:

- Lesende junge frau, 1906, oil on canvas, Kunsthalle Kiel
- Blumengarten (ohne Figur), 1908, oil on canvas, Sotheby's purchaser 8 February 2012
- Anna Wieds Garten, 1907, oil on canvas, Private Collection
- Steigende Wolken, 1927, oil on canvas, Karl-Ernst-Osthaus-Museum, Hagen
- Grosse Sonnenblumen, 1928, oil on canvas, The Metropolitan Museum of Art, New York
- Blumen und Wolken, 1933, oil on canvas, Museum Sprengel, Hanover

In recent years, Nolde's paintings have achieved prices of several million US dollars, in auctions conducted by the leading international auction houses. On 8 February 2012, Blumengarten (ohne Figur) was sold by Sotheby's in London for US$3,272,673.

== Nazi-looted art ==
Nolde's work has become the focus of renewed attention after a painting entitled Blumengarten (Utenwarf) from 1917, which now hangs in the art museum Moderna Museet, Stockholm, Sweden, and has been valued at US$4 million, was discovered to have been looted from Otto Nathan Deutsch, a German-Jewish refugee whose heirs, including a Holocaust survivor, are asking for its return. The Swedish government decided in 2007 that the museum must settle with the heirs. Deutsch was forced to flee Germany before World War II and left for Amsterdam in late 1938 or early 1939. The painting was sold to the Swedish museum at an auction in Switzerland, where it had resurfaced in 1967.

In 2015, Nolde's Maiwiese (Maienwiese) [Meadow in May], 1915, (Inv. Nr. 94) was restituted by the Lentos Art Museum in Linz to the heirs of Dr. Otto Siegfried Julius.

In 2017 the Wilhelm Lehmbruck Museum Foundation restituted the painting “Women in a Flower Garden” by Emil Nolde to the heirs of Eduard Müller who was murdered in a Nazi concentration camp in 1942.

In 2019 the city of Düsseldorf agreed to restitute Nolde's The Actress to the heirs of Curt Schueler. The painting had been acquired for Düsseldorf by Conrad Doebbeke.

In 2000 the Wilhelm Lehmbruck Museum Foundation, Duisburg rejected a restitution request from the family of the Breslau (Wroclaw) collector Dr. Ismar Littmann for Nolde's painting Buchsbaumgarten (Boxtree Garden).

== See also ==
- Sunflowers
- Unpainted Paintings
