= Das Leben Jesu =

Das Leben Jesu may refer to:

- Das Leben Jesu by David Strauss
- Life of Jesus (Hegel) (German: Das Leben Jesu), by G. W. F. Hegel
- Das Leben Jesu, by Christoph Friedrich von Ammon

== See also ==
- Life of Jesus (disambiguation)
- Christ myth theory
- Gospel harmony
- Jesus
- Jesus in comparative mythology
- Jesus of Nazareth (TV series)
- Life of Christ (disambiguation)
