= Life of Jesus (disambiguation) =

Life of Jesus may refer to:

- Life of Jesus in the New Testament
- Chronology of Jesus
- Historical Jesus
- Life of Christ in art

== Books ==
- Das Leben Jesu, an essay by G. W. F. Hegel
- The Life of Jesus, Critically Examined, an 1835 book by David Friedrich Strauss
- イエスの生涯 (A Life of Jesus), a 1973 book by Shūsaku Endō
- The Life of Jesus (Renan) (Vie de Jésus), an 1863 essay

== Films ==
- Jesus: His Life, a 2019 drama series
- La Vie de Jésus (English: The Life of Jesus), a 1997 film

== See also ==
- Christ myth theory
- Gospel harmony
- Jesus
- Jesus in comparative mythology
- Jesus of Nazareth (TV series)
- Life of Christ (disambiguation)
- Das Leben Jesu (disambiguation)
