= Positive religion =

Positive religion may refer to:

- a concept in the essay "Life of Jesus (Hegel)"
- Religion of Humanity
- Positive Religion (book) by Robert Alfred Vaughan
