= Life of Christ (disambiguation) =

Life of Christ most commonly refers Life of Jesus in the New Testament.

Life of Christ may also refer to:

== Art ==
- Life of Christ in art
- Life of Christ (circle of Cimabue?), a series of paintings speculatively attributed to the circle of Cimabue (1290–1300)
- Life of Christ (Giotto), a series of paintings attributed to Giotto (1320–1325)
- The Life of Christ (Nolde), a 9-panel polyptych by Emil Nolde (1911–1912)

== Literature ==
- Vita Christi, the principal work of Ludolph of Saxony, completed in 1374
- Life of Christ, an 1874 book by Frederic Farrar
- Life of Christ, a book by Henri Didon
- The Story of Christ, a 1921 book by Giovanni Papini, published as Life of Christ in the US

== See also ==
- Life of Jesus (disambiguation)
