= Raising of the Cross =

Distinct subject in Christian art

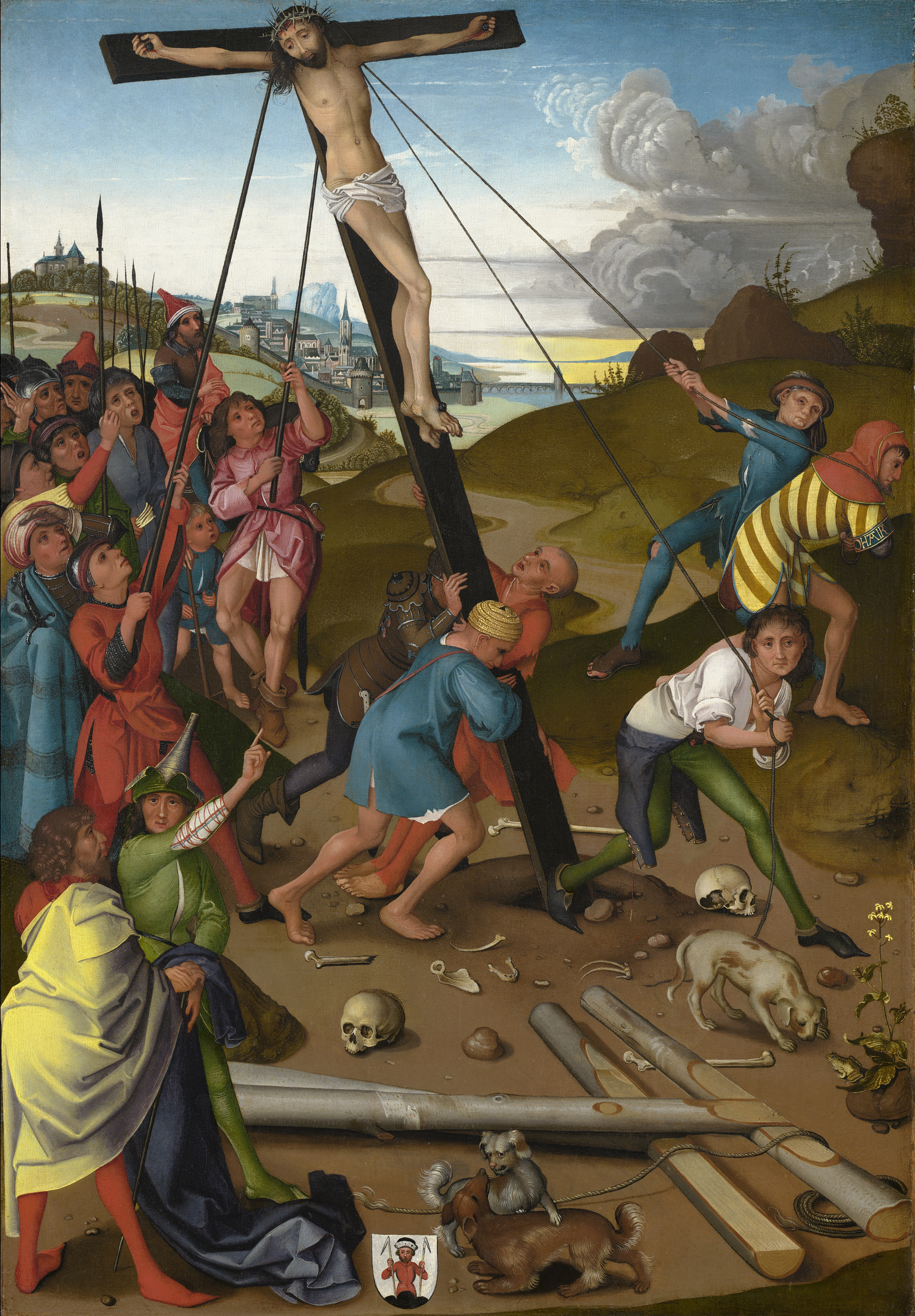
Central panel of a triptych by the Master of the Starck Triptych, c. 1485

The raising of the Cross or elevation of the Cross has been a distinct subject in the Life of Christ in art depicting the start of the Crucifixion of Jesus.

The subject became popular in the sixteenth and seventeenth centuries, with artists such as Tintoretto, van Dyck, and Rubens among the first to produce significant works with the subject.

== Description ==
Although the nailing of Jesus on the cross and the raising of the cross are not described in the Gospels, Christian art has depicted these scenes as part of the narrative of the crucifixion of Jesus. The Gospels only describe Jesus being "crucified" on the Golgotha, and do not provide a detailed account of process.

As an iconographic subject, the raising of the cross depicts the moment when, after Jesus was nailed on the cross on the ground, the cross is raised to a vertical position by Roman soldiers, sometimes using ropes or ladders. Figures named in the Gospels may be present at the scene, such as Pontius Pilate, Mary, mother of Jesus, the beloved disciple and the women at the crucifixion.

At the Council of Trent in 1563, the following statement was pronounced regarding the raising of the cross, explaining the use of ropes in representations:

After Jesus had been nailed to the Cross, lying upon the ground, the executioners raised the instrument of punishment by means of ropes, the foot being first planted in a hole which had previously been dug.

== Interpretation ==
In the Gospel of John, Jesus predicted that he would be "lifted up from the earth" (John 12:32) in order to draw all men to himself. John notes that Jesus was referring to his death (John 12:33).

== Notable depictions ==
Notable depictions of the raising of the Cross include:

- The Elevation of the Cross by Peter Paul Rubens (two paintings, 1610 and 1638)
- The Raising of the Cross by Rembrandt (1633)

== Gallery ==
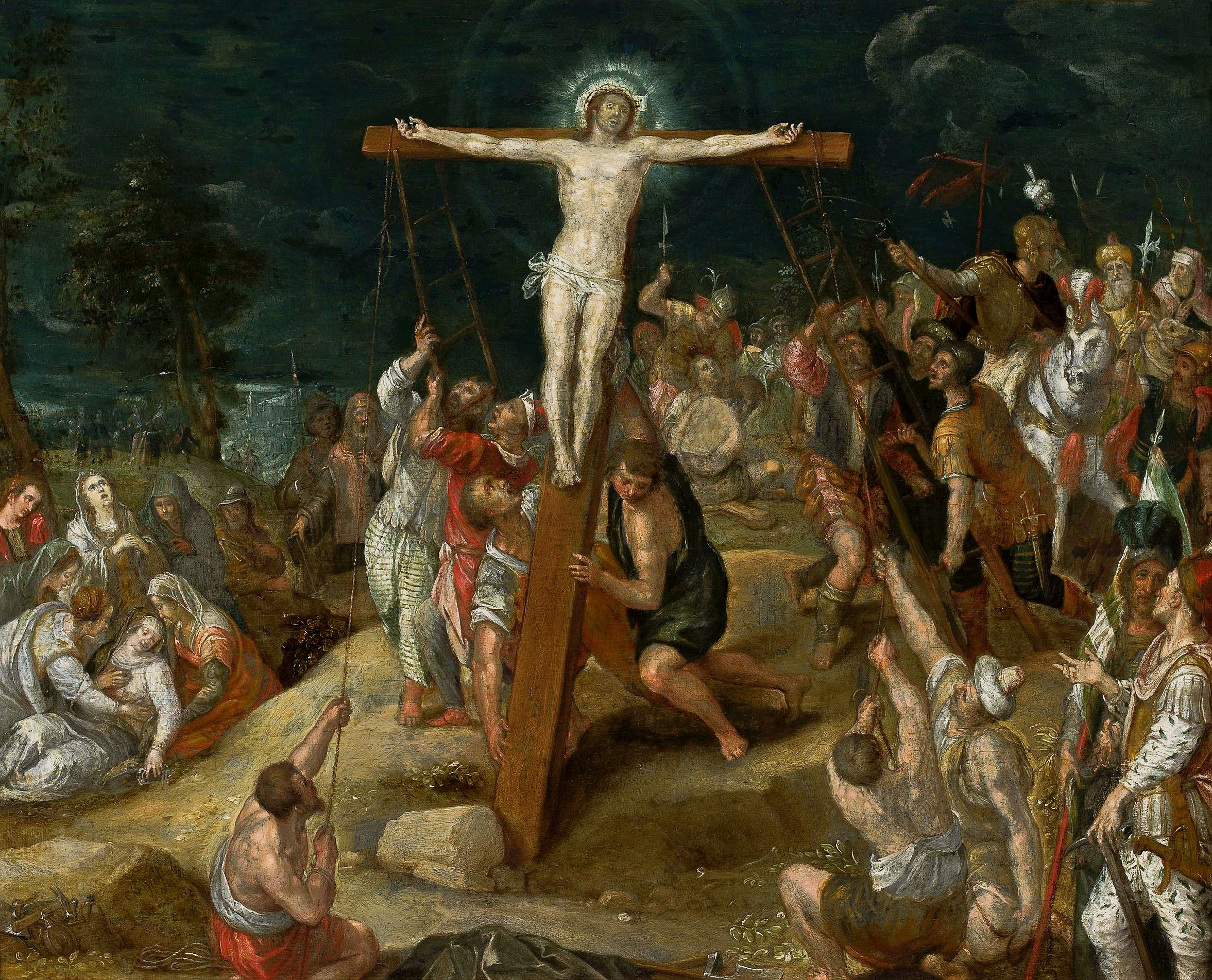
Christoph Schwarz, 1587

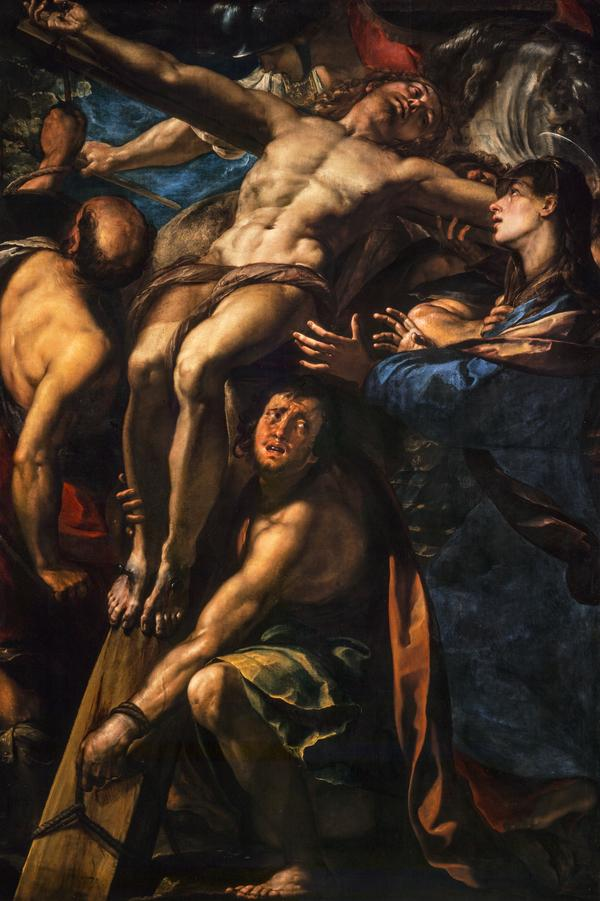
Giulio Cesare Procaccini, 1620

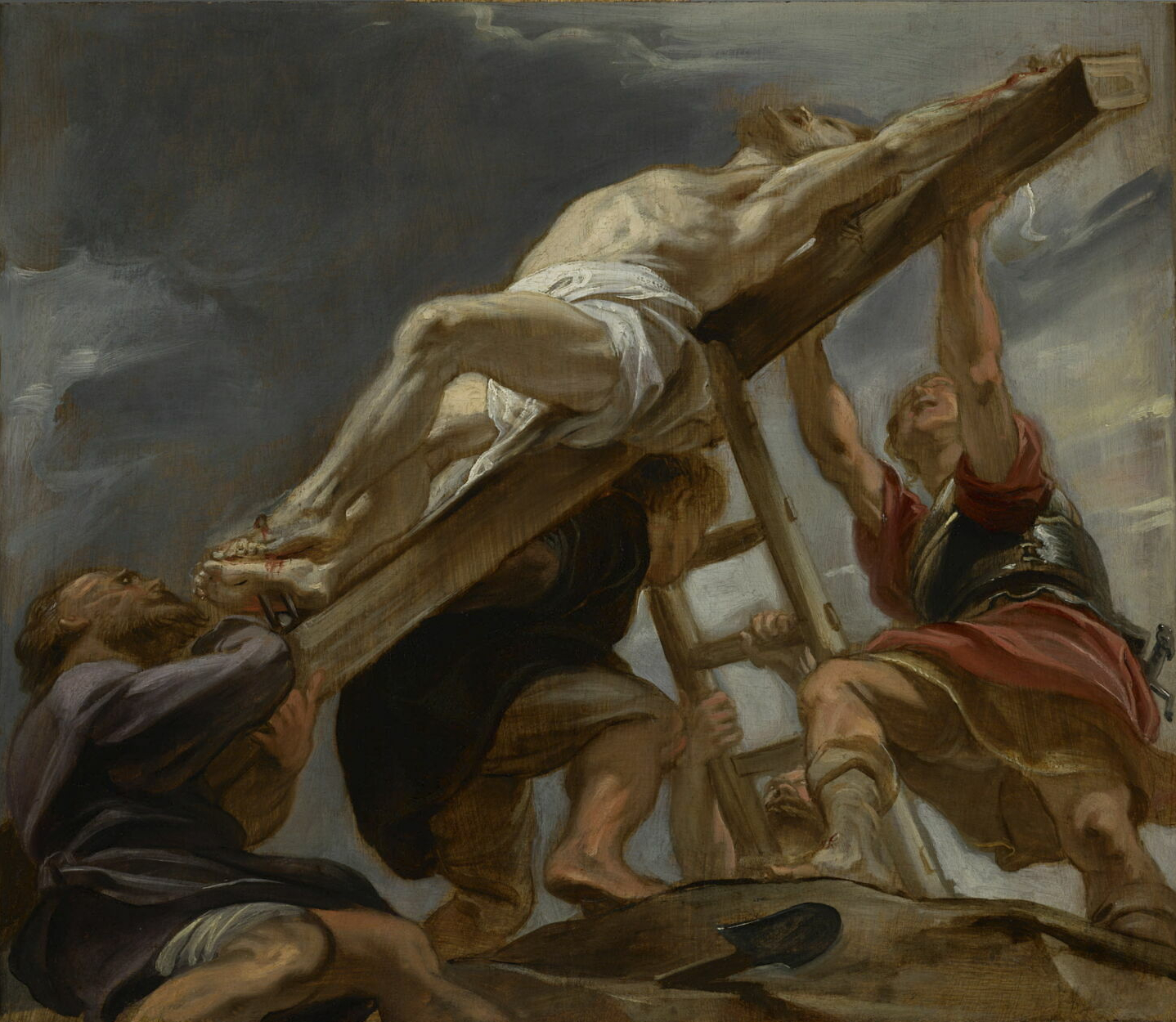
Peter Paul Rubens, 1620

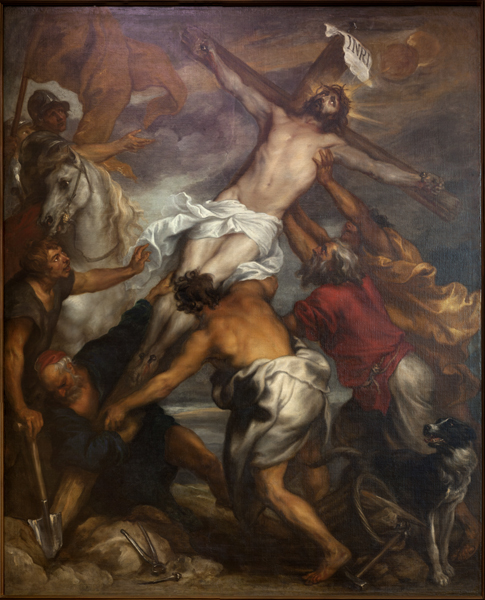
Anthony van Dyck, 1631

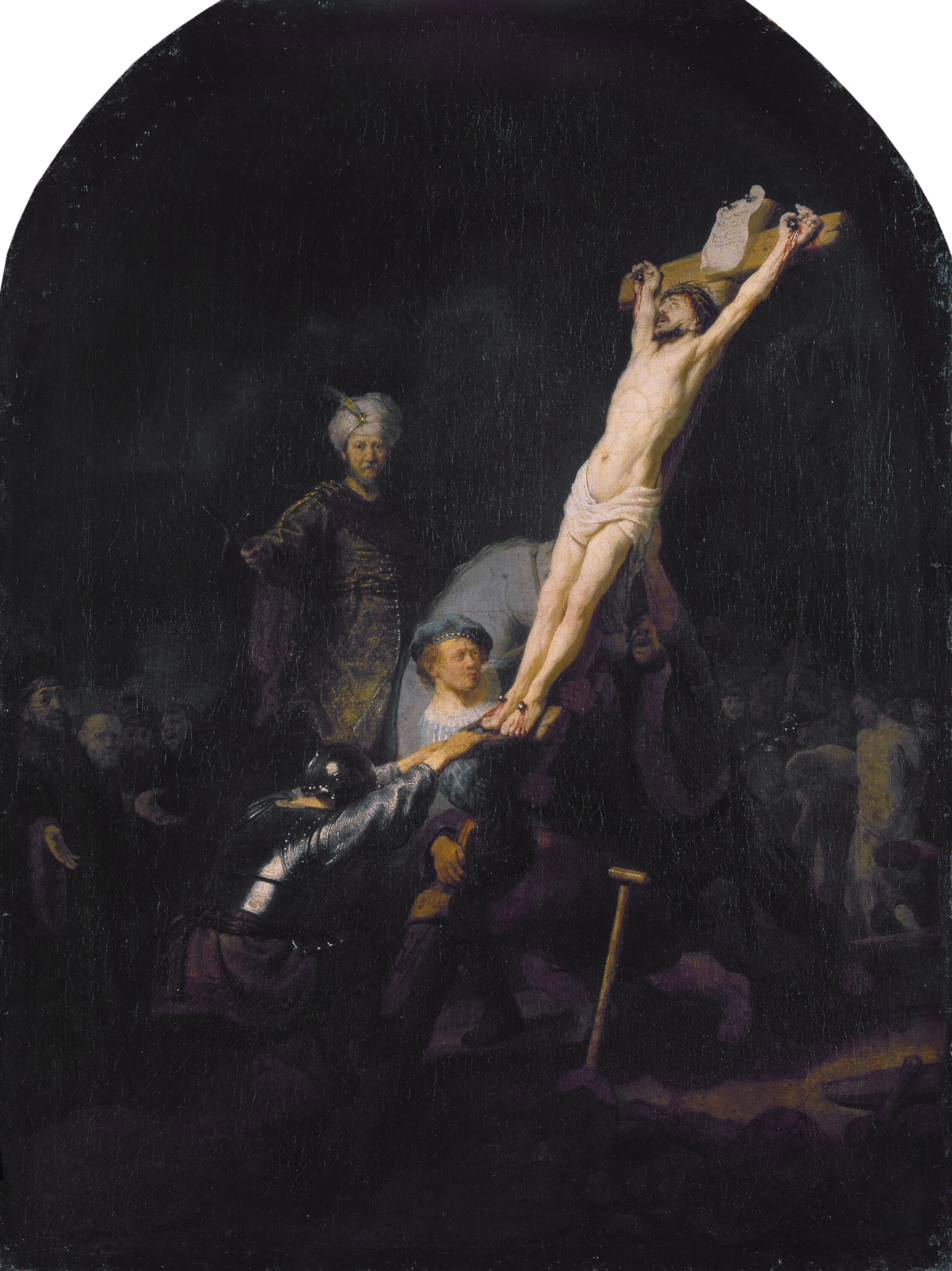
Rembrandt, 1633

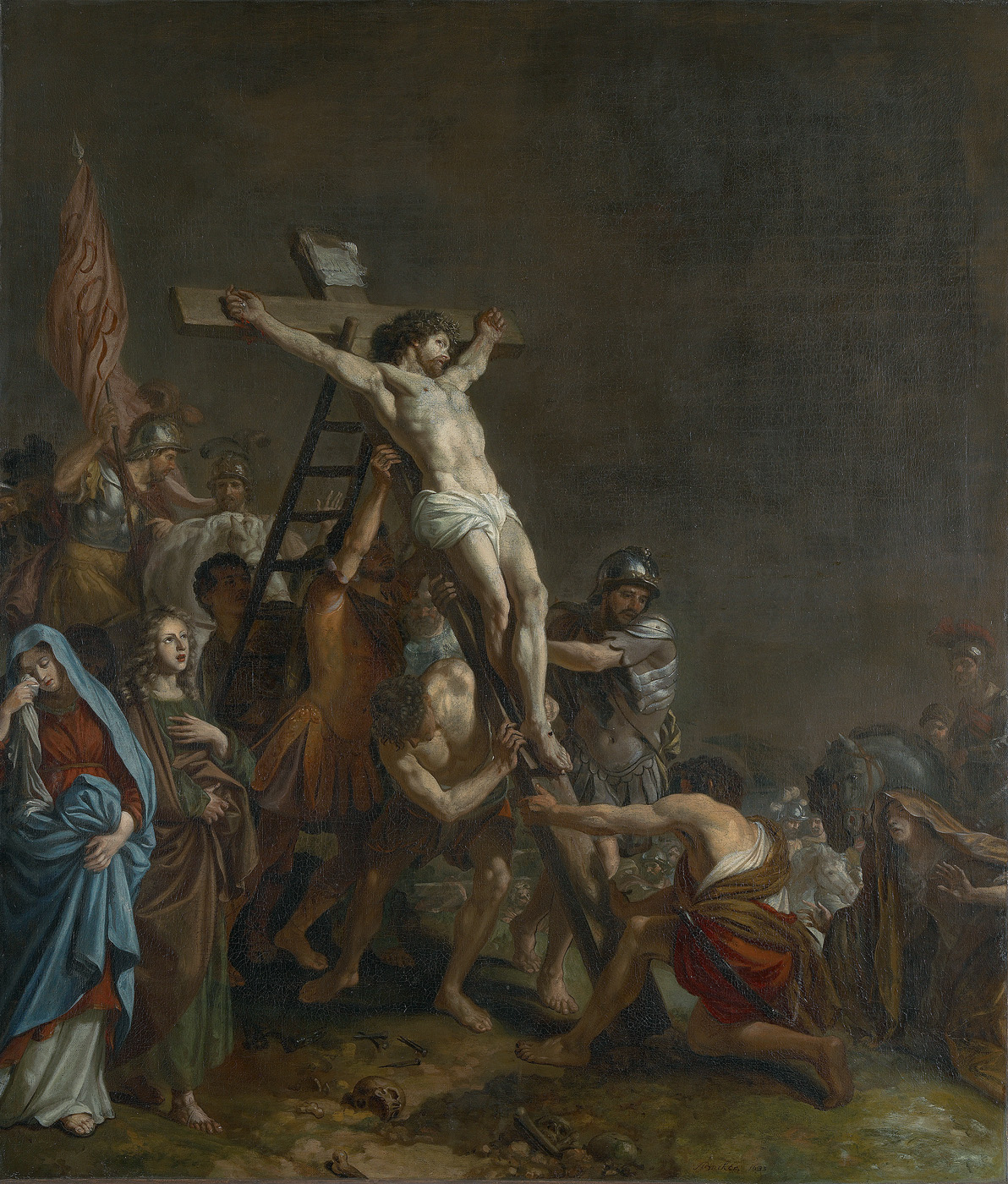
Adriaen Backer, 1683

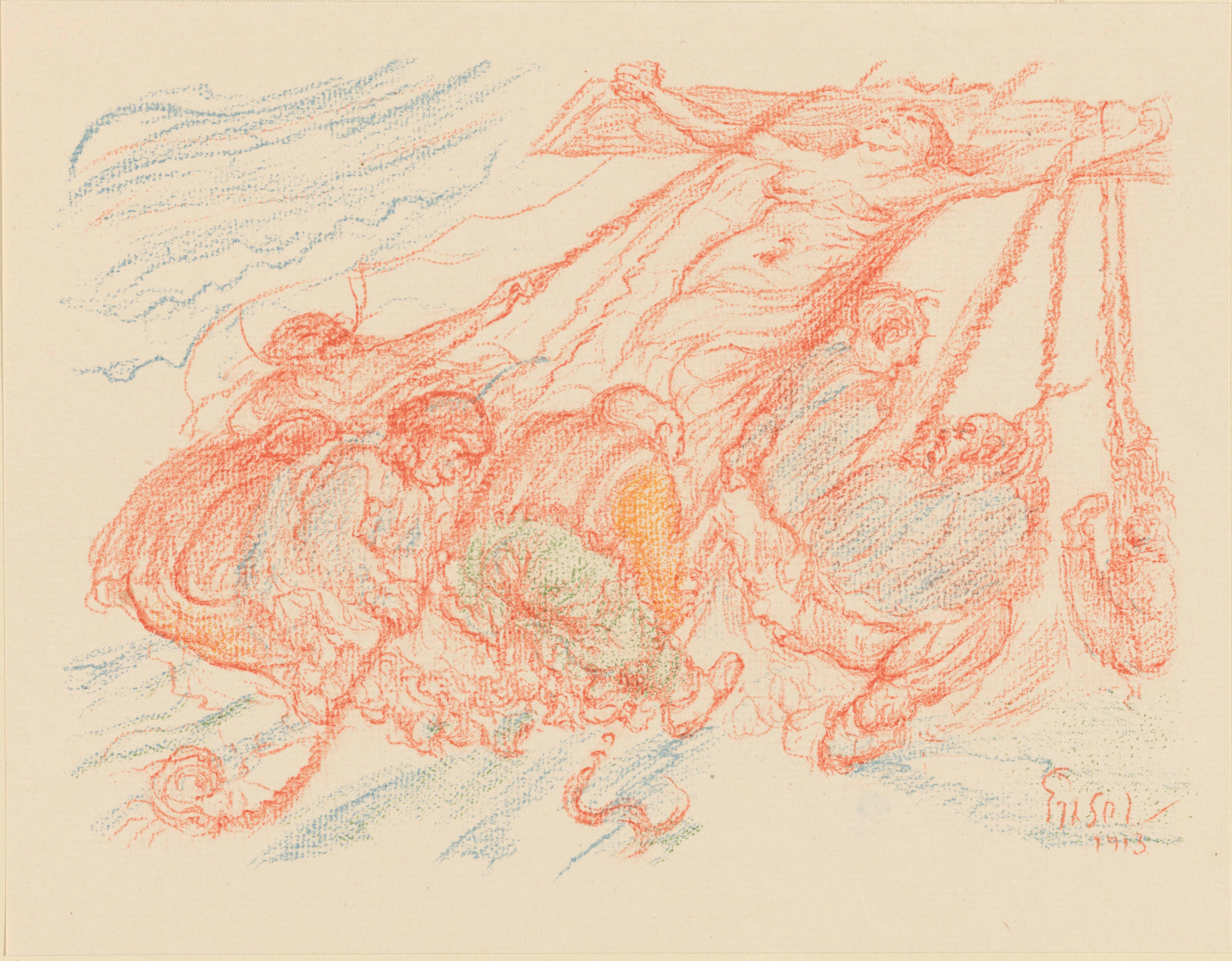
James Ensor, 1921

== See also ==
- Christ carrying the Cross
- Crucifixion in the arts
- Descent from the Cross
