= Life of Christ (circle of Cimabue?) =

Series of paintings attributed to the circle of Cimabue

The Life of Christ is a series of five paintings in tempera and gold on panel depicting scenes from the Life of Christ and (in the final panel) the Last Judgement. The works date to around 1290–1300 and are attributed to the circle of Cimabue or to a Venetian artist. They are now in various museums and private collections: the Longhi Foundation in Florence, the New Orleans Museum of Art, the Portland Art Museum, the Pedralbes Monastery near Barcelona and a private collection in Milan.

Similar in style and dimensions (about 18 cm²), they were probably originally part of a larger unknown group from an unknown location. This original group was probably not a predella, since sections of these were usually rectangular not square, but may instead have been a small polyptych.

== Attribution ==
Roberto Longhi was the first to study the group, only four of which were then known; the Last Judgement and Crucifixion were rediscovered later. He attributed them to Cimabue himself, as did Adolfo Venturi, Wilhelm Suida, G. Fiocco and H. Gronau. Brandi, however, assigned them to an artist influenced by Cimabue, as did Samek Ludovici and Van Marle, who spoke of an artist of the Tuscan School. Edward Garrison (confirmed by Federico Zeri) attributed them to an unknown 13th-century Venetian artist whom he named the "Speaking Christ Master", and to whom he also attributed a small Madonna and Child in the National Gallery, London, now assigned to the Master of Badia a Isola. The latest studies place the group in a pre-Duccio Sienese context, though there is little agreement among scholars. Perking instead assigns them to a 13th-century Roman School, whereas Bernard Berenson more prosaically states they are 14th-century Greco-Byzantine works, and the most recent studies of Luciano Bellosi place the group in a Venetian environment.

Among the works in the group in museum collections, only the Longhi Foundation panel is attributed to Cimabue himself. Those in the United States, both originally in the collection of Samuel Henry Kress, are now assigned to an anonymous master.

== List ==
Image	Title	Dimensions in cm	Country	City	Place	Attribution and notes
	Nativity	17.3 × 18	Italy	Florence	Longhi Foundation	Via the Foresi Collection.
	Last Supper	17 × 18	United States	New Orleans	New Orleans Museum of Art	
	Arrest of Christ	18 × 16	United States	Portland, Oregon	Portland Art Museum	
	Crucifixion	18 × 18.2	Spain	Barcelona	Pedralbes Monastery	
	Last Judgement	18 × 17	Italy	Milan	Bagnarelli Collection	In the Foresti Collection in Milan in the 1930s, before passing to that of B. Canto in Milan (1950–1963) and then to its present collection.

== Bibliography ==
- Sindona, Enio (1975). Cimabue e il momento figurativo pregiottesco (in Italian). Milan: Rizzoli Editore. [ISBN unspecified]
