= Life of Jesus (Hegel) =

1795 essay by Georg Wilhelm Friedrich Hegel

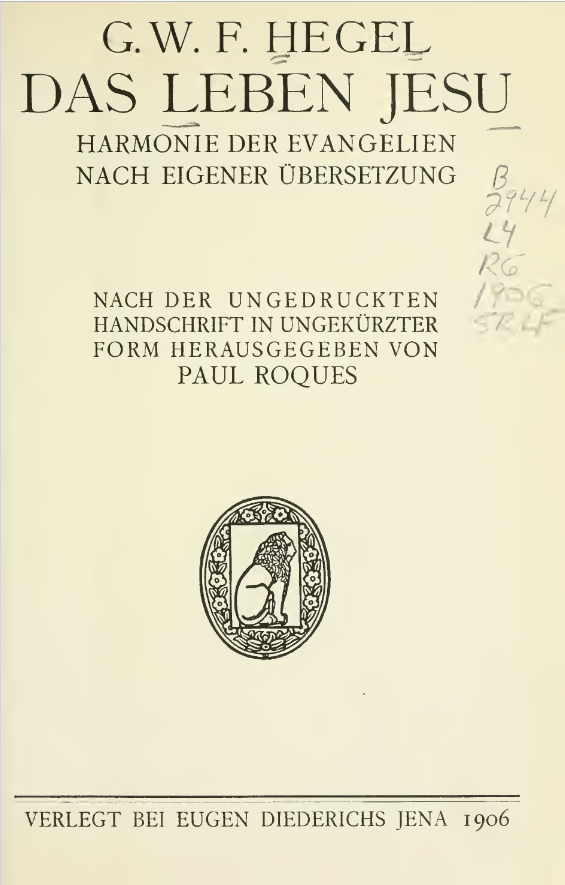
Life of Jesus, German: Das Leben Jesu

Life of Jesus (German: Das Leben Jesu) is one of the earliest works by G. W. F. Hegel. Found amongst his posthumous papers from 1795, it remained an unpublished manuscript until 1906.

== Content ==
In this essay on morality Hegel presents a version of Jesus very similar to Immanuel Kant's categorical imperative; it also stays close to Kant's Religion Within the Limits of Reason Alone. For Hegel the moment Jesus cried out "why hast thou forsaken me", was the moment he knew sin and evil, for evil is the separation of the individual from the universal.

Jesus is presented as a rationalistic philosopher, opposed to the superstition and "positive religion" of the Pharisees. Positive religion is a religion that has a definite historic founder, and is characterised rather sociologically: at this stage religion becomes an objective system of laws and rules.

Hegel presented biblical miracles as metaphors for Jesus' philosophical doctrines. Whether related with the tenor of Hegel's philosophy of immanence, or just because it remained fragment, the history stops with the crucifixion. The resurrection of Jesus is absent, along with the other paschal events.
