= Josef Block =

German painter

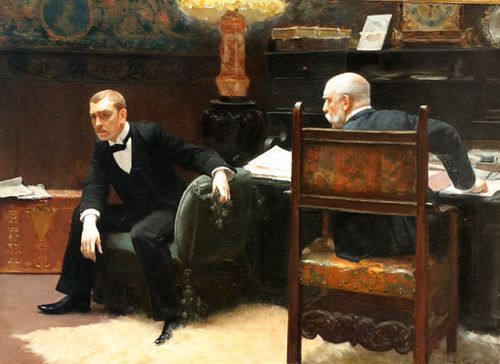
The Wayward Son (1890)

Josef Block (27 November 1863 – 20 December 1943) was a German painter.

== Life and career ==
Block was born in Bernstadt an der Weide (Bierutów) in Prussian Silesia. He was a scholar of the Breslau (Wrocław) Art Academy, where his lifelong friendship with German dramatist Gerhart Hauptmann was established. He continued his studies at the Munich Academy of Fine Arts; in the studio of his tutor Professor Bruno Piglhein, Block was involved in painting Piglhein's Jerusalem Panorama. On 29 February 1892, the Society of Visual Artists of Munich was founded in his studio at Munich's Theresienstrasse, which was to be the basis of the Munich Secession, a movement of artists who felt that art was not sufficiently contemporary and open. This happened in preparation for the World Columbian Exposition 1893 in Chicago, where Block won a medal for his painting 'Twilight'.

In 1895 Block married Else Oppenheim, the daughter of banker and councilor of commerce Hugo Otto Oppenheim and a descendant of banker Joseph Mendelssohn. After living in Munich until 1896 he moved to Berlin. He continued painting biblical histories, realistic genre paintings, portraits and still lifes, selling paintings in Germany and the United States. Further expositions include the Grand Berlin Art Exposition and Paul Cassirer's parlor. Block was also a co-founder of the Berlin Secession, a movement similar to the Munich Secession. Other members of the Berlin Secession include Lovis Corinth, Max Liebermann, and Edvard Munch. Block liked traveling and was a passionate photographer. Block was persecuted by the Nazis in 1933, due to his Jewish ancestry, and forced to sell paintings from his collection. His apartment at Derfflinger Str. 16 in Berlin was seized by the Generalbauinspektor under Albert Speer. He died in Berlin in 1943.

== Selected works ==
- Christ and the Samaritan (1887)
- The last ray of sun (1888)
- Bathseba (1889)
- The lost son (1890 in Munich, 1891 golden medal in Berlin)
- Twilight (realistic interieur, 1893 medal in Chicago)
- The new master (Munich Secession 1894)
- Adulteress (1897)
- Saul and David (1899)
- Pietà (1902)
- Judith (1904–1905)
- South Italian Scene (around 1930)
- The scientist (1942)

== See also ==
- List of German painters

== Sources ==
- Lorenz, Detlef: Zur Biographie des schlesischen Malers Josef Block. In: Jahrbuch der Schlesischen Friedrich-Wilhelms-Universität zu Breslau 42-44 (2001–2003) [2003], 709–714.
- Tschörtner, Heinz Dieter: Gerhart Hauptmanns letzter Jugendfreund Josef Block aus Bernstadt (1863–1943). In: Jahrbuch der Schlesischen Friedrich-Wilhelms-Universität zu Breslau 38/39 (1997/1998) [1998], 773–781.
