= Emanuel Hegenbarth =

German painter

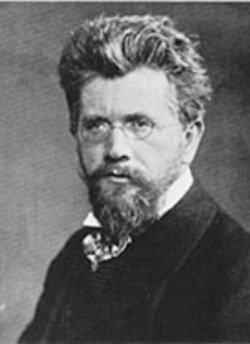
- Hegenbarth c. 1904
- Born: 14 January 1868; Böhmisch Kamnitz, German Empire
- Died: 18 July 1923 (aged 55); Dresden, Weimar Republic

Emanuel Hegenbarth (German pronunciation: [eˈmaːnu̯eːl ˈheːɡn̩baʁt]; 14 January 1868 – 18 July 1923) was a German painter and graphic artist. Most of his works feature animals.

== Life and work ==
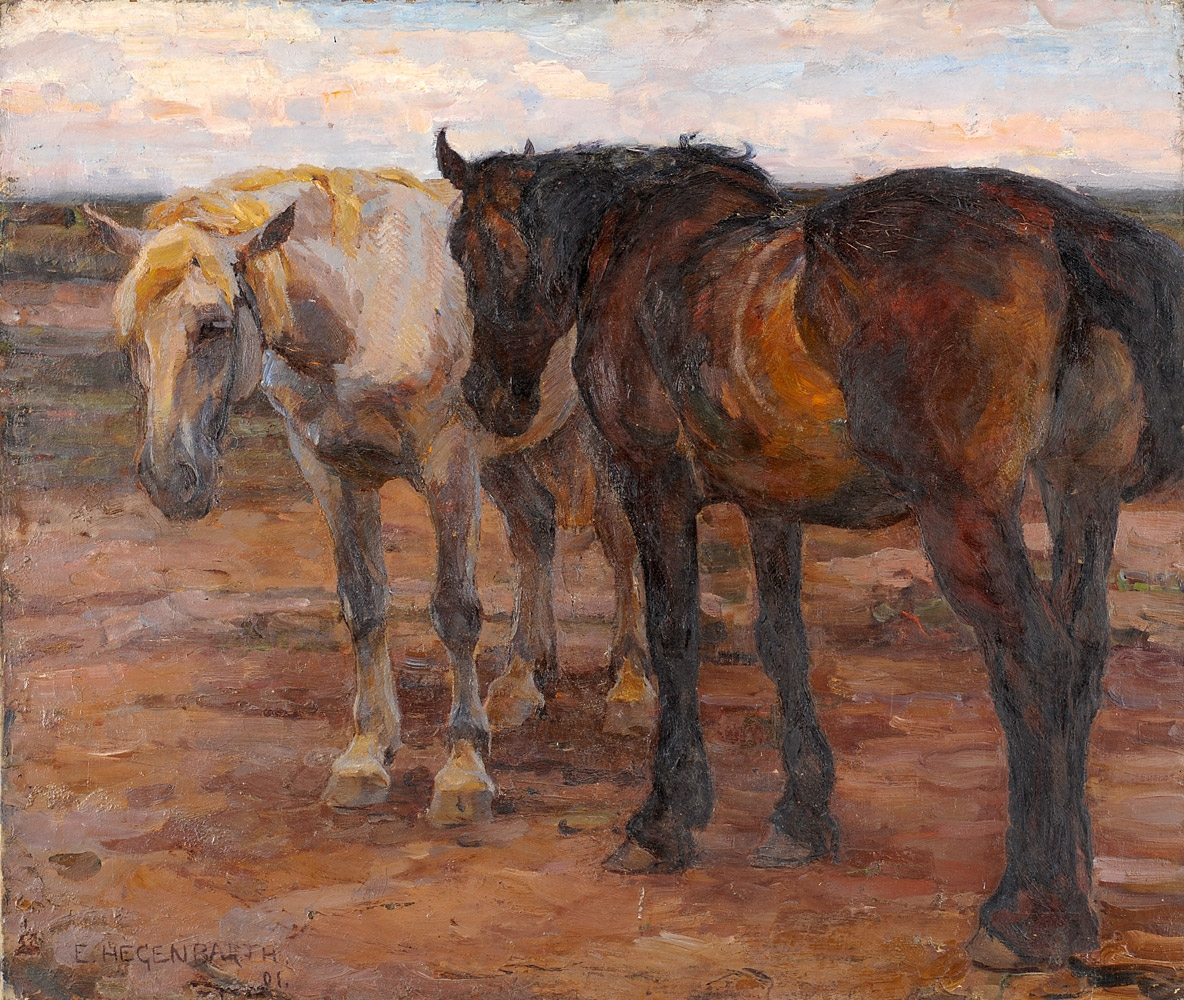
Two Horses

=== Early life ===
His initial drawing lessons came from the Czech painter, Eduard Steffen. In 1884, he began studying at the Academy of Fine Arts, Munich. After two years, his studies were interrupted by illness so, at the request of his father, a glass maker, he switched to a commercial course at a business school in Leipzig. In 1892, he went back to his original interests, at the Academy of Arts, Berlin, then returned to Munich to complete his studies.

Gabriel von Hackl and Carl Marr were his first instructors, but his primary influences came from a class in animal painting taught by Heinrich von Zügel, one of the founders of the Munich Secession. He also joined the Verein bildender Künstler Dresden, which would later become the inspiration for the Dresden Secession. After its dissolution in 1900, he was affiliated with Die Elbier, a circle of artists associated with Gotthardt Kuehl . From 1901, he worked as a freelance artist in Munich. In 1902, he married Zügel's eldest daughter, Anna Emilie.

=== Career ===
Later on, in 1903, he received an offer to teach at the Academy of Fine Arts and took position as a Professor for their newly established animal painting class. His first students included Kurt Schwitters. His motto was "a visual artist does not speak", and refused to participate in discussions about art.

In 1909, he was one of the founding members of the Künstlervereinigung Dresden (artists' association). From 1905 to 1908, he served as a mentor to his young cousin, Josef Hegenbarth, who became a famous painter and illustrator.

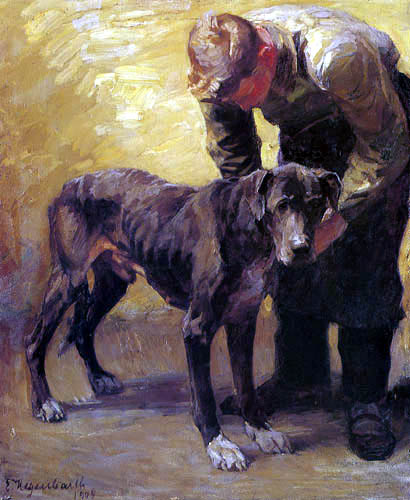
Man with a Mastiff

He died in 1923, at the age of fifty-five, from complications suffered after undergoing surgery for an unspecified chronic health problem.
