= Hugo von Habermann =

German painter

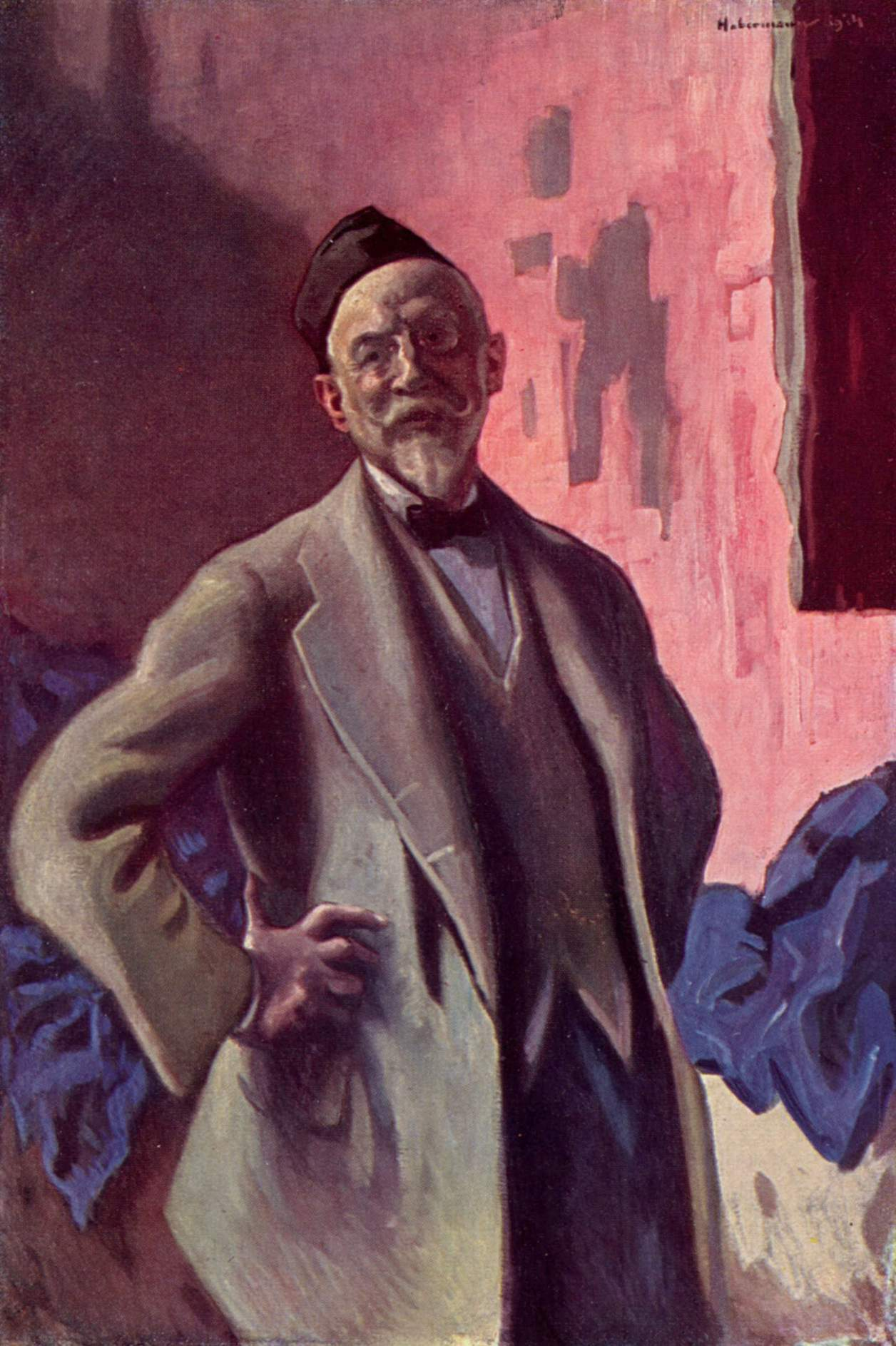
Self-portrait (1914)

Hugo Joseph Anton Freiherr von Habermann (14 June 1849 – 27 February 1929) was a German painter and draftsman. He is sometimes referred to as "the Elder" to distinguish him from his nephew of the same name, who was also a painter.

== Life ==
Habermann was born in Dillingen, the son of Philipp, Baron von Habermann, by his marriage to Pauline, Countess Leutrum von Ertingen. In 1858 the family moved to Munich, where Habermann attended prestigious schools and had his first lessons in art. In 1868 he began studying law, but he showed little enthusiasm for a legal career.

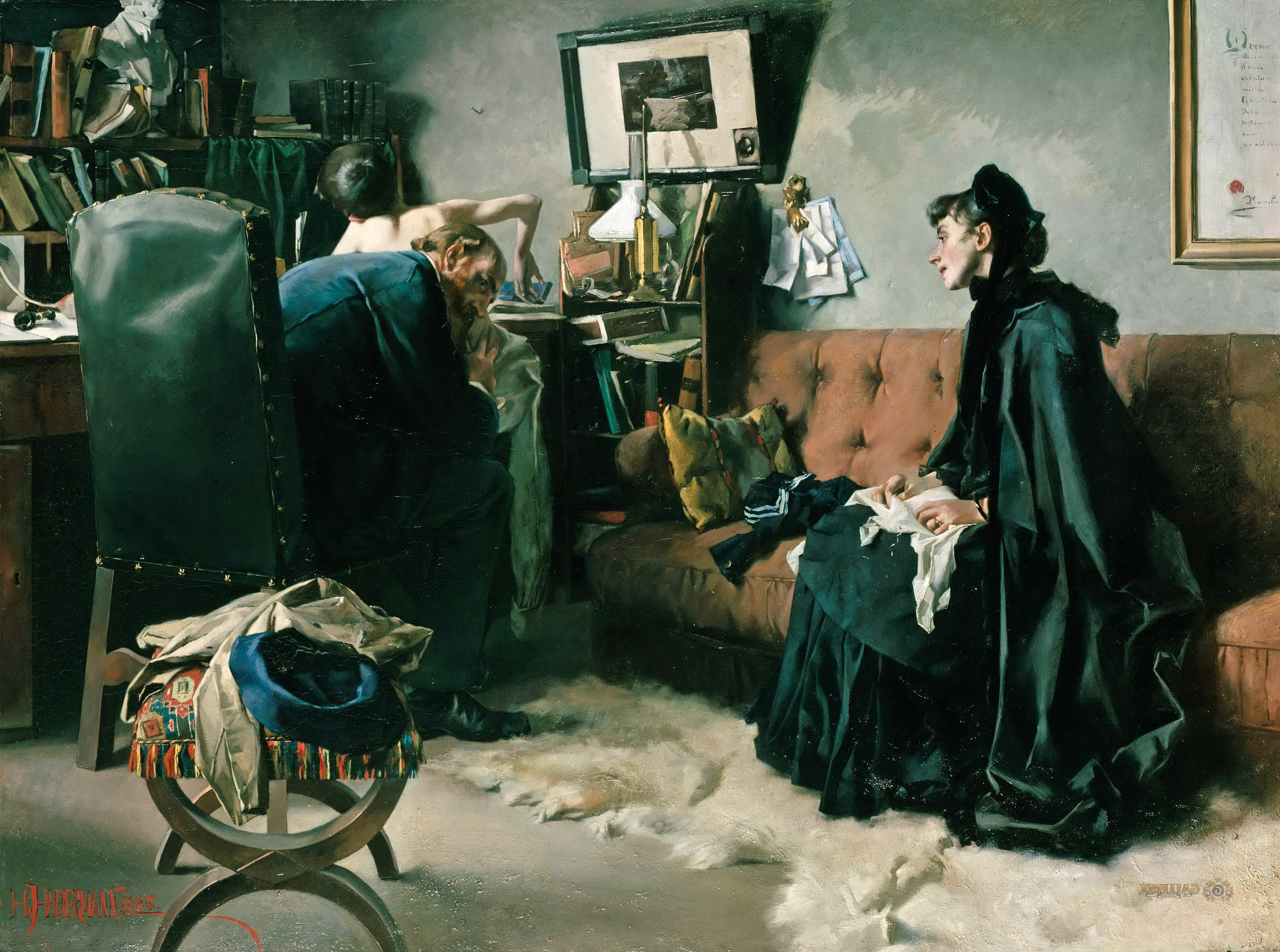
Consultation ("Problem Child", 1886), the best-known painting from his early period

In 1870, he served as an army officer in the Franco-Prussian War, but despite this distraction managed to produce his first painting on the subject of Ruth and Boaz. The following year, he was appointed to oversee the artists who were painting portraits of the prisoners-of-war in Ingolstadt. It was then that he decided to give up his law studies and become a painter.

When Habermann returned to Munich, he took some preliminary lessons from Hermann Schneider (1847–1918), then entered the Academy of Fine Arts. In 1874, he was accepted for the master class of Karl Theodor von Piloty. He had his first exhibition four years later. He completed his studies in 1879 and opened his own studio.

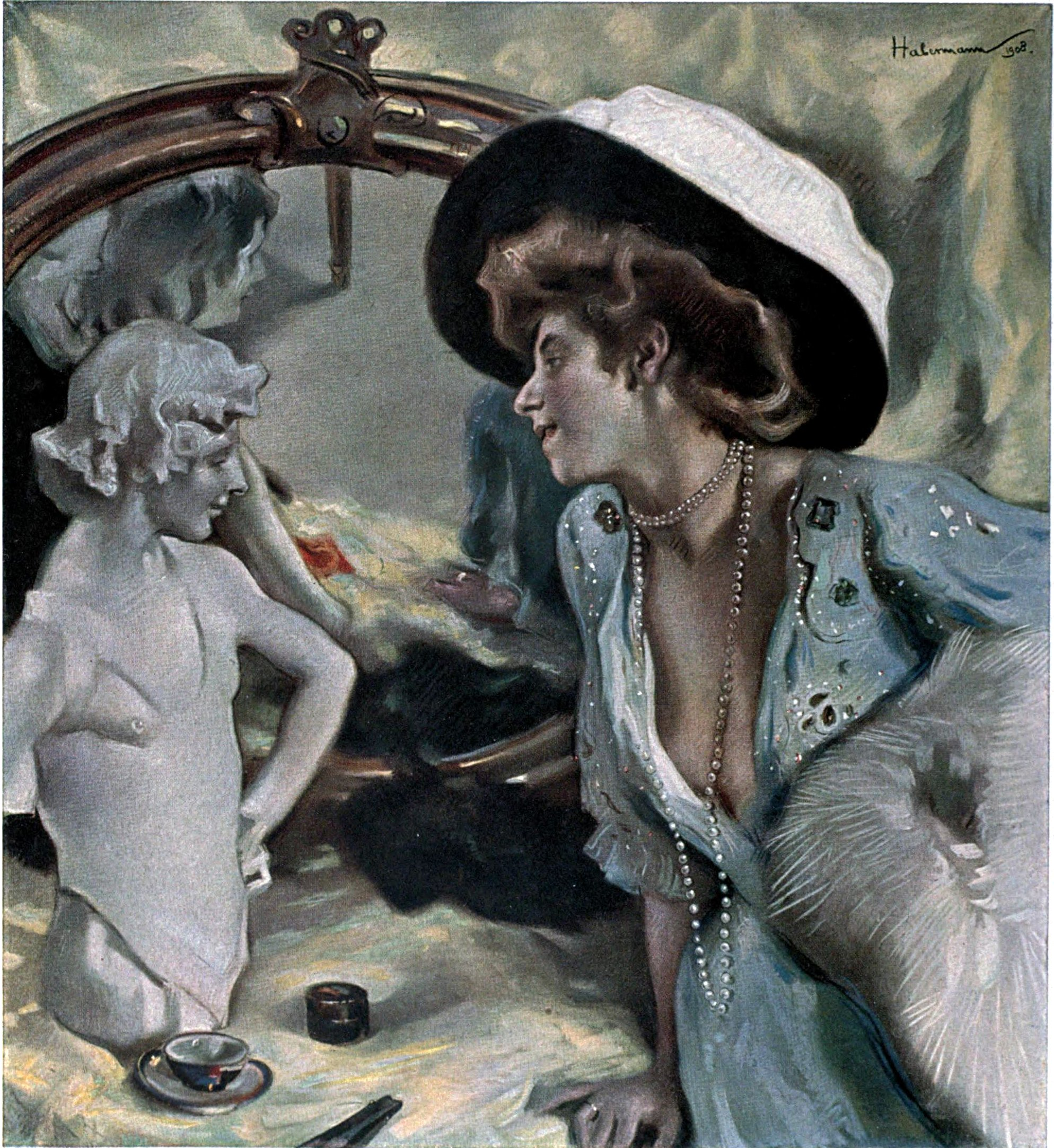
Portrait of a Lady (1908), an example of his later period

Together with Bruno Piglhein and Fritz von Uhde, he opened a private art school in 1880. Unfortunately, it attracted few students and was soon closed. That same year, he joined Allotria, an organization for "revolutionary" artists that would be a precursor to the Munich Secession. At the Munich International Art Exposition of 1897, Luitpold, Prince Regent of Bavaria, named him a Royal Bavarian Professor (a largely ceremonial position) for his painting Salomé. In his later years he would, in fact, specialize in portraits of women.

=== Later career and honors ===
Habermann was a co-founder of the Secession and became its second President, after Piglhein. In 1905, he was appointed a full Professor at the Academy and, in 1909, was named a member of the Bavarian Maximilian Order for Science and Art. During this period, he discovered the Spanish painter El Greco, which had an immediate and obvious effect on his style. In 1922, he married his long-time model and companion, Olga Hess. Two years later he retired and, the following year, received the Pour le Mérite, Civil Class, from Paul von Hindenburg, the President of Germany.

His health began to deteriorate in 1928 and he moved into his studio, becoming a virtual recluse until his death in Munich on 27 February 1929.
