= Wasaplatz =

Square in Dresden, Germany

Coordinates: 51°1′42″N 13°44′34″E

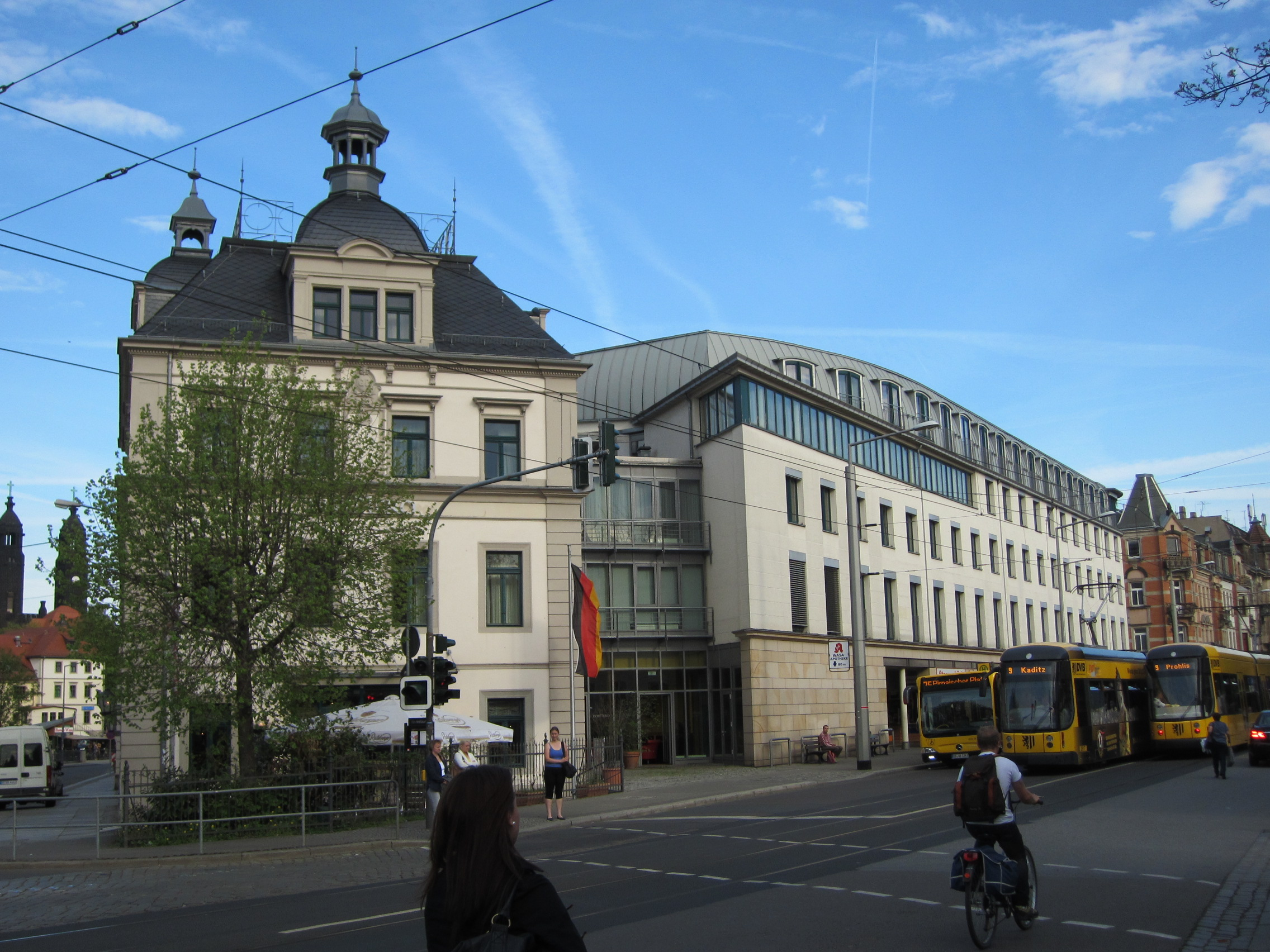
Hotel Königshof, Wasaplatz

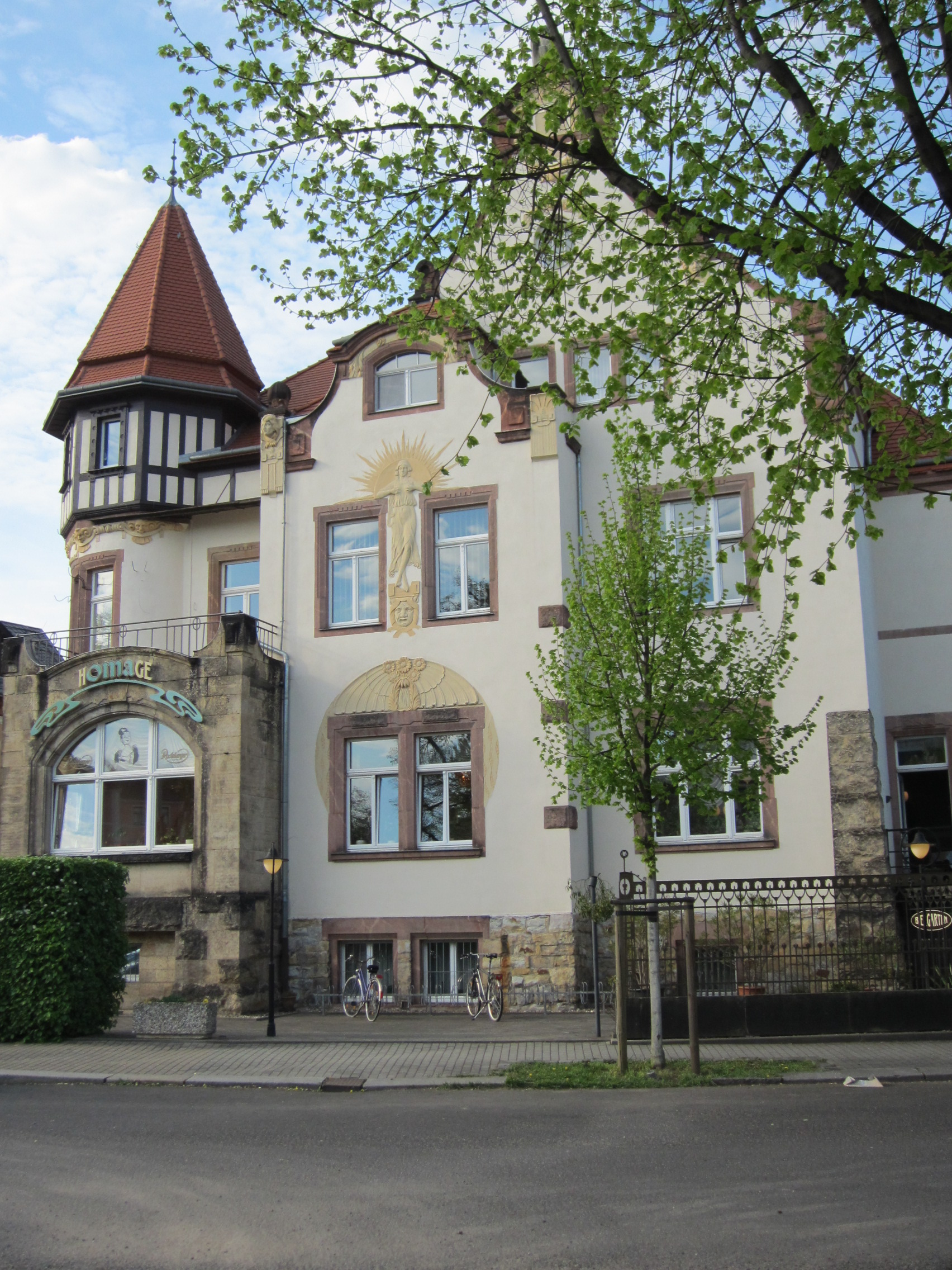
Villa Wasa

The Wasaplatz is a square in Dresden, Germany, a transportation hub outside of the city centre. The area around the square is named after the Swedish-Polish royal Vasa family, and it is the district centre of Dresden-Strehlen. It contains the Hotel Königshof, built in 1888–89, and the Villa Wasa, built in 1903.

== Description ==
Now an important city hub and shopping area, the square is at the centre of the district of Strehlen with its hotels, restaurants and residential buildings. A commercial building containing the Wasa Pharmacy was constructed in c. 1880 near the Königshof Hotel, giving the name of Wasa both to the square and neighbouring Wasastraße in view of connections with the Polish-Swedish House of Vasa.

The Königshof, formerly Strehlener Hof, is known for its ballroom with Neo-Renaissance frescos and decorative stucco. Built in the Art Nouveau style, the Villa Wasa dates from 1903. Under the German Democratic Republic, the building served as the August Bebel Cultural Centre. It has recently been used as a restaurant.

The oak tree standing at the centre of the square was planted on 24 April 1898 to commemorate the 25th anniversary of the crowning of King Albert of Saxony. It now enjoys heritage protection.
