= Julius Lippelt =

German sculptor

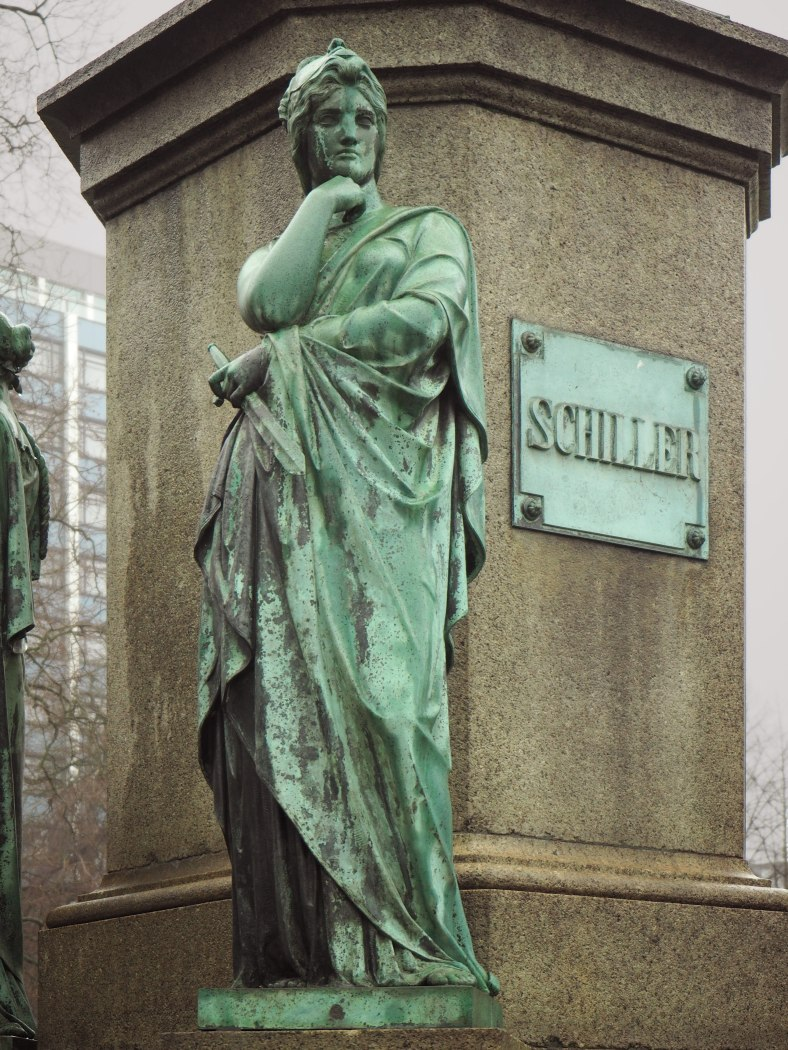
"Drama", from the Schiller Monument

Julius Lippelt (5 December 1829, in Hamburg – 17 August 1864, in Hamburg) was a German sculptor.

== Biography ==
His father, a merchant, died while Julius was still young. After displaying his talents by modelling animals in clay, he received his basic artistic training from the sculptor, Ernst Gottfried Vivié. In 1847, he was able to attend the Prussian Academy of Arts and work in the studios of Ludwig Wilhelm Wichmann. He spent 1859 in Italy, working on a commission for a statue of Venus and Adonis.

In 1860, he took part in a competition to design the Schiller Monument, and his draft design was accepted. He was, however, able to complete only two of the four base figures ("Drama" and "Story"), when he died of tuberculosis, aged only thirty-four. The monument was completed by his friend and associate, Carl Börner. Just prior to his death, he had been awarded second place in a competition to create an equestrian monument, honoring Frederick William II of Prussia, in Cologne.

From 1832, he was a member of the Hamburger Künstlerverein. He was interred at the Ohlsdorfer Friedhof.

== Sources ==
- Hans Speckter (1883). "Lippelt, Julius". Allgemeine Deutsche Biographie (in German). Vol. 18. Leipzig: Duncker & Humblot. p. 734.
- Carl Heitmann: Zeittafel der Geschichte der Hamburger Turnerschaft von 1816: 1816 – 1882. Herbst, Hamburg, 1883, S. 14. (online)
