= Bruno Piglhein =

German sculptor and painter

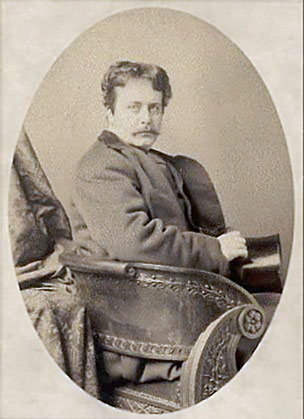
- Bruno Piglhein (photograph by Franz Hanfstaengl, c.1886)
- Born: February 19, 1848
- Died: July 15, 1894 (aged 46)

Elimar Ulrich Bruno Piglhein (19 February 1848 – 15 July 1894) was a German sculptor and painter. He was a founder and the first President of the Munich Secession.

== Life ==
He was born in Hamburg. His father was a decorator. Upon graduating from the Gymnasium, he studied with the sculptor Julius Lippelt. After Lippelt's death from tuberculosis, Piglhein went to the Dresden Academy of Fine Arts, but had to leave after two years for an alleged lack of talent. The sculptor Johannes Schilling saw that he had some potential, however, and took him into his studio. After a short stay in Italy, Piglhein decided to take up painting instead and, on Schilling's recommendation, began studies with Ferdinand Pauwels at the Weimar Saxon-Grand Ducal Art School. Finding the small town atmosphere uncongenial, in 1871 he moved to Munich, where he became an associate of Wilhelm von Diez. Despite the attention given to his painting of the Crucifixion at the Munich exhibition and the positive critical reception accorded to his portraits of children, he was not very successful. At the suggestion of his agent, he turned to pastel portraits of women; favouring Spanish dancers, pierrettes and belles-of-the-ball with low décolletage. He then came into fashion, but also found himself being criticised as a bad moral influence and a "courtesan painter".

=== The Crucifixion ===
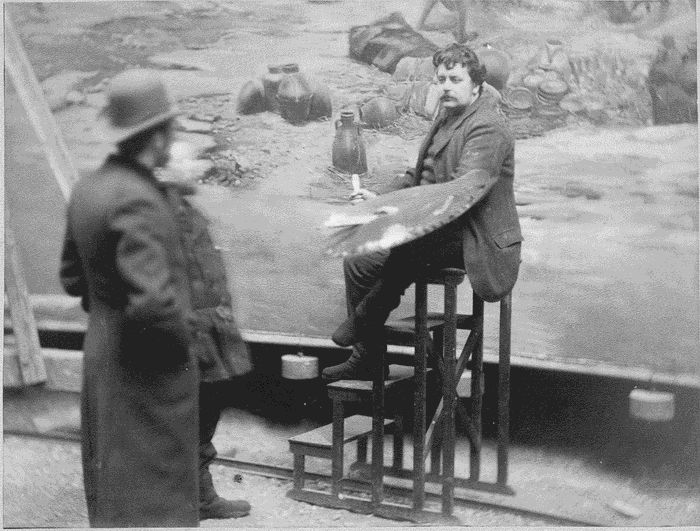
Piglhein with Joseph Halder

In 1885, he found an opportunity to restore his reputation. Joseph Halder, a businessman from Munich, conceived plans for a circular, panoramic painting depicting the Crucifixion of Christ and, recalling Piglhein's work at the Munich Exhibition, the commission was given to him. From 1885 to 1886, he made a trip to Jerusalem, where he made sketches for what would become his magnum opus. Under his direction, the landscape painters Josef Block, Johann Adalbert Heine (1850–1905) and Josef Krieger (1848–1914) created the scenes, while Piglhein executed the figures. The work was displayed in Munich, Berlin and Vienna, where it was destroyed by a fire in 1892. Ten photographs of the work were taken on opening day. At least 15 copies of the work were made (some of which were made by his assistants, who were not under Piglhein's contractual obligations to produce but one panorama). Extant panoramas are located in Einsiedeln, Switzerland and Sainte-Anne-de-Beaupré in Québec, Canada.

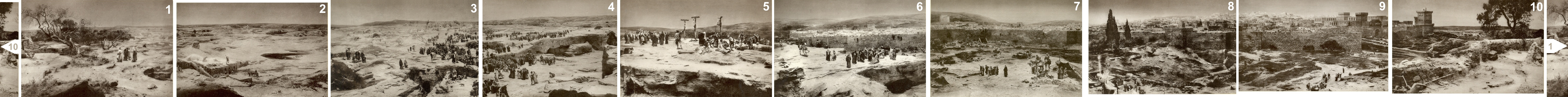
The ten photographs

In 1886, he was appointed a Professor at the Academy of Fine Arts Munich. With his reputation reestablished, he began to produce large canvases on religious themes and portraits. In 1892, he became one of the founders and the first President of the Munich Secession, although he was already suffering from physical ailments that inhibited his ability to work. He died in 1894 in Munich.
