= Munich Secession =

German art movement founded 1892

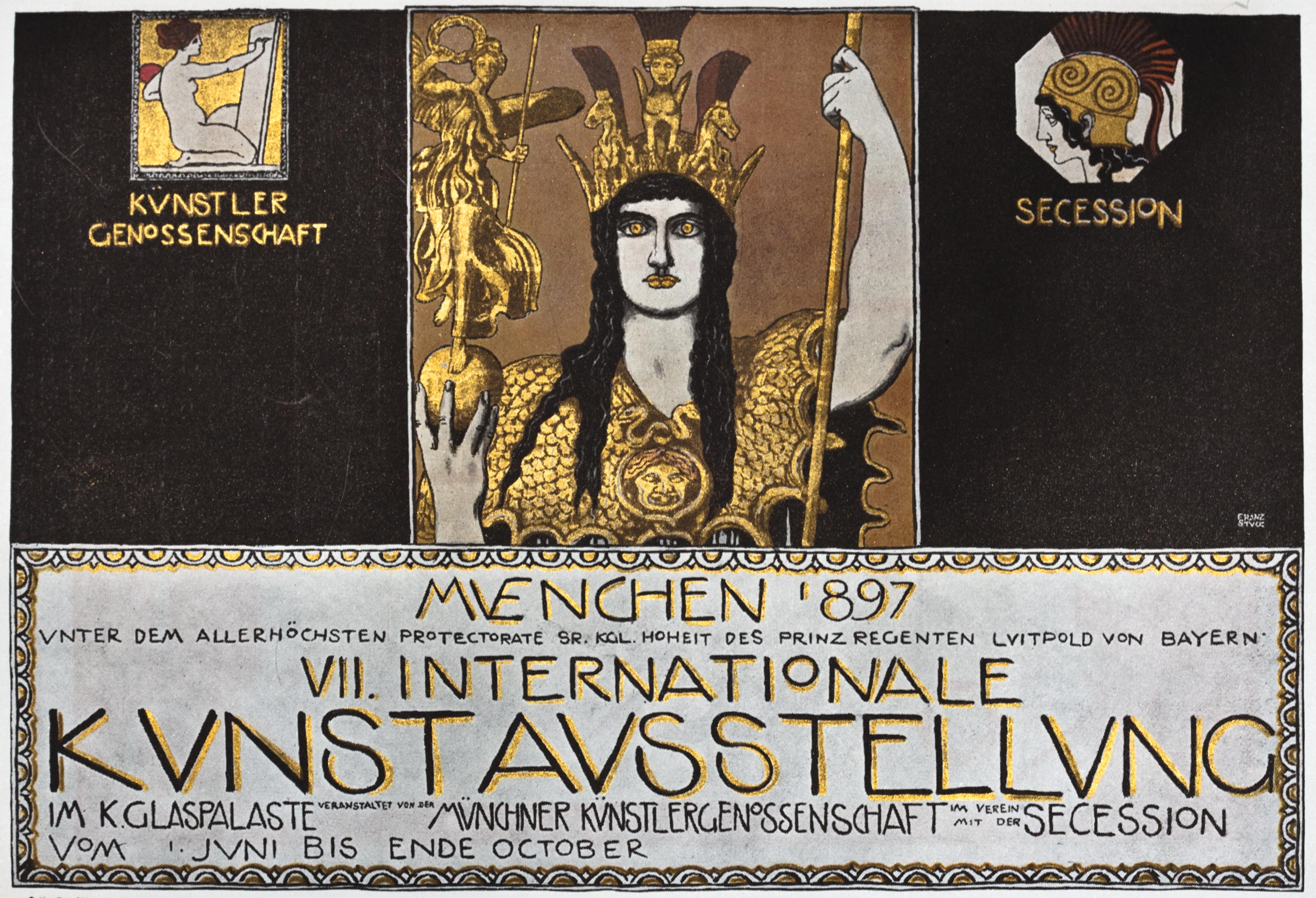
- Poster by Franz von Stuck for the Seventh International Art Exhibition in Munich, 1897
- Years active: 1892–1938 and 1946–present
- Location: Germany
- Major figures: Bernhard Buttersack, Ludwig Dill, Bruno Piglhein, Ludwig von Herterich, Paul Hoecker, Albert von Keller, Gotthardt Kuehl, Hugo von Habermann, Robert Poetzelberger, Franz von Stuck, Fritz von Uhde and Heinrich von Zügel

The Munich Secession (German Münchener Secession) was an association of visual artists who broke away from the mainstream Munich Artists' Association in 1892, to promote and defend their art in the face of what they considered official paternalism and its conservative policies. They acted as a form of cooperative, using their influence to assure their economic survival and obtain commissions. In 1901, the association split again when some dissatisfied members formed the group Phalanx. Another split occurred in 1913, with the founding of the New Munich Secession.

== Background ==
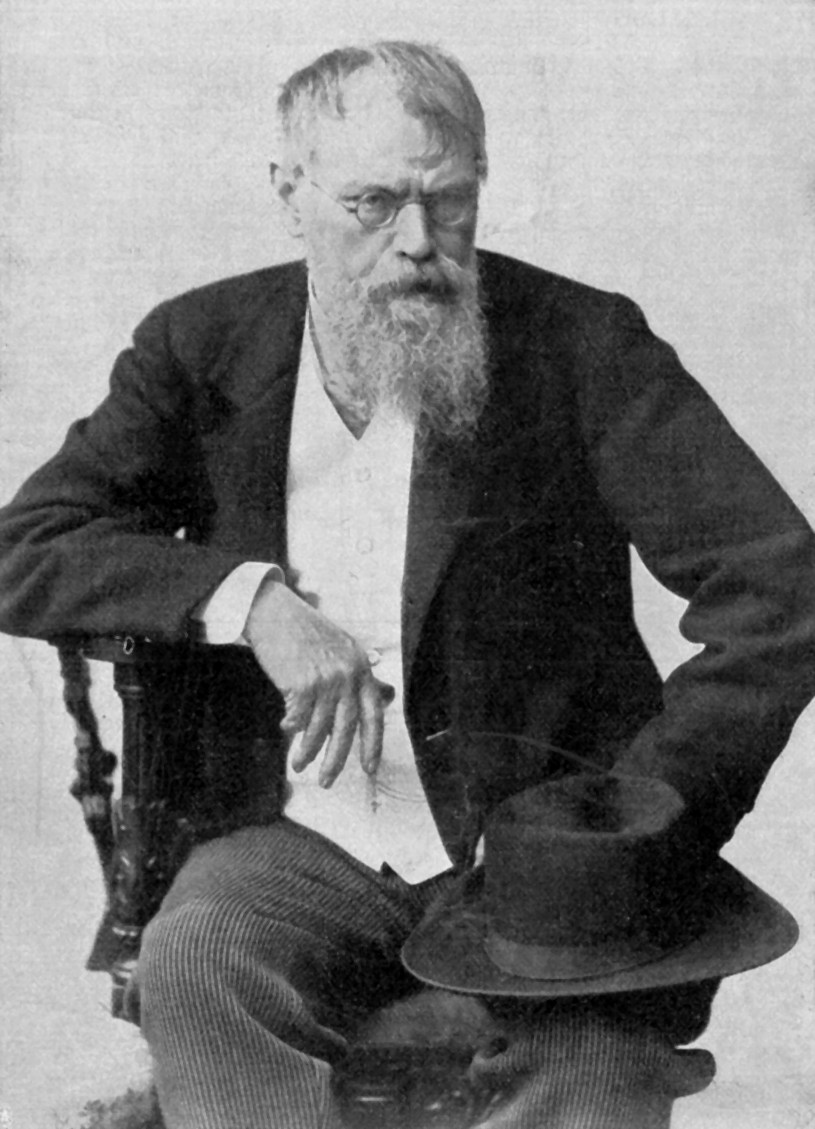
Franz von Lenbach, the "Prince of Painters". From Die Gartenlaube, c. 1900

By the end of the nineteenth century, more artists lived in Munich than lived in Vienna and Berlin put together. However, the art community there was dominated by the conservative attitudes of the Munich Artists' Association and its supporters in the government. These attitudes found expression in the official "mission statements", written by the so-called "Prince of Painters" (Malerfürst) Franz von Lenbach. Matters came to a head in 1891 when the Prince-Regent Luitpold of Bavaria founded the Prinzregent-Luitpold-Stiftung zur Förderung der Kunst, des Kunstgewerbes und des Handwerks in München, an art foundation devoted to promoting traditional history painting in the service of the state. This foundation created and maintained a high level of artistic quality and brought world attention to the Academy of Fine Arts, but was firmly opposed to impressionism, expressionism, symbolism and other contemporary trends in the art world.

Another factor was the complete financial failure of an exhibition in 1888 at the Glaspalast, organized by the Artists' Association. This led to a bitter debate about responsibility and the exhibition's content which grew so furious, it attracted the attention of the Ministry of State for Science and Art.

To address this situation, a group of artists with a progressive outlook gathered together in 1892, announced their separation from the official Artists' Association and established the Munich Secession, with an eye toward exhibiting at the upcoming World's Columbian Exposition. They called for a transformation in the ideas of what constitutes art and promoted the idea of an artists' freedom to present works directly to the public.

Man soll auf unseren Ausstellungen Kunst sehen und jedes Talent, ob älterer oder neuerer Richtung, dessen Werke München zur Ehre gereichen, soll seine Blüte reich entfalten können. (One should see, in our exhibitions, every form of art, whether old or new, which will redound to the glory of Munich, whose art will be allowed to develop to its full flowering.)

In this statement of principles, the artists declared their intentions to move away from outmoded principles and a conservative conception of what art is.

== Foundation ==
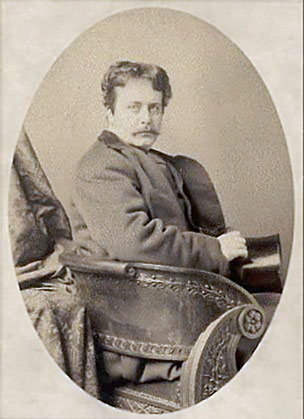
Bruno Piglhein, first president of the Munich Secession

On 4 April 1892, ninety-six artists who had resigned from the official association, established the Association of Visual Artists of Munich. Bruno Piglhein was elected the first president and Paul Hoecker became the first secretary. In a few months the original name gave way to the more popular name: Munich Secession.

Financial support initially came from three sources: Georg Hirth, a writer and journalist who coined the word "secession" to describe the spirit of the various art movements at that time. In 1896, he would establish the Art-Nouveau magazine Jugend; Georg von Vollmar, editor of the Democratic Socialist party's official organ; and Hans Veit zu Toerring-Jettenbach, a member of the liberal opposition to the government's policies.

That same year saw the creation of another breakaway association, the Luitpold-Gruppe, composed of more moderate artists who wanted to maintain the high-quality standards of the academy. The Vienna Secession followed five years later, and the Berlin Secession was established in 1898.

== Exhibitions ==
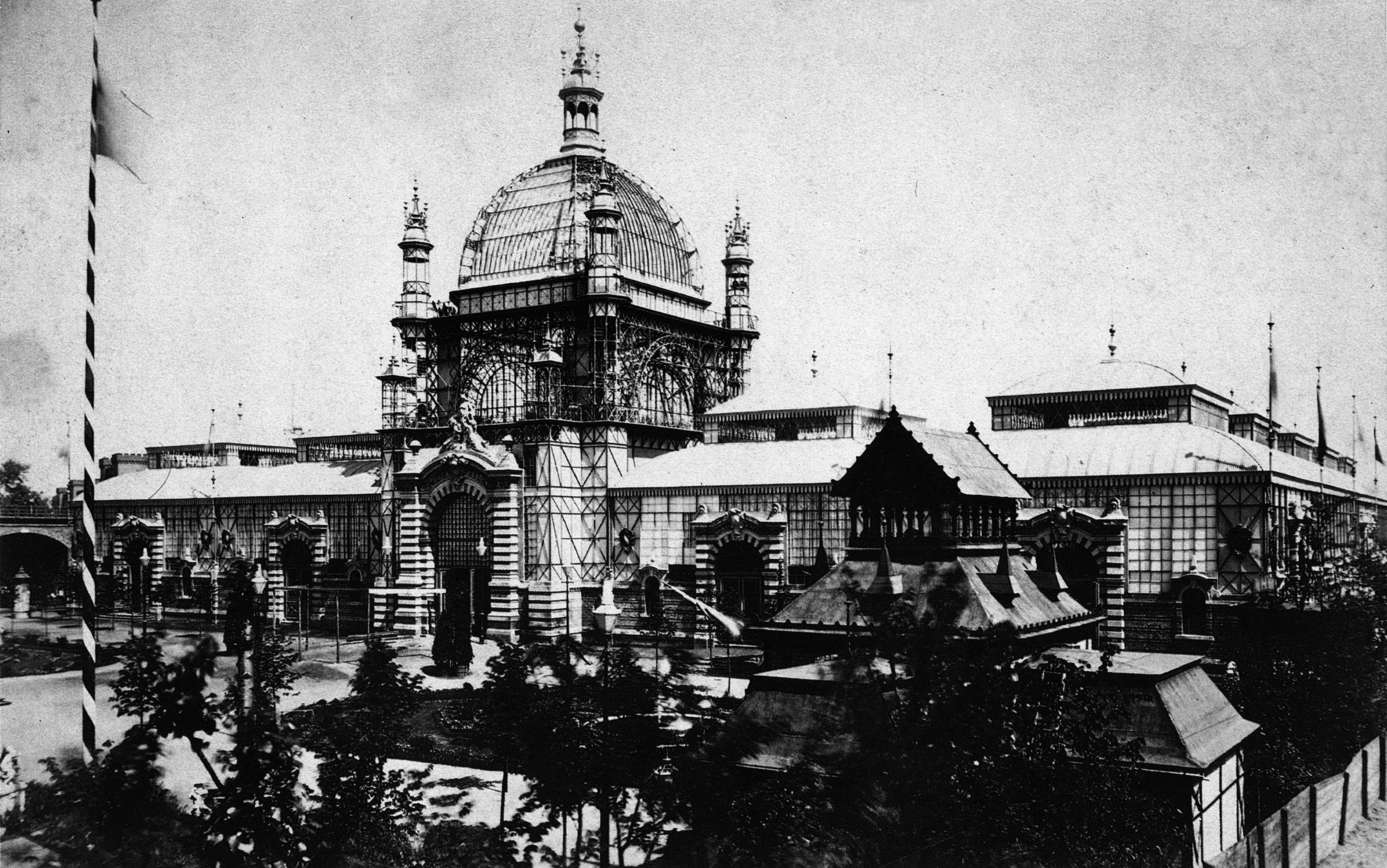
The National Exhibition Building (ULAP), c. 1885

At first, the secession had some difficulty finding a building for their exhibitions. The city of Frankfurt offered to provide the necessary space and 500,000 gold marks, if the group would move there permanently. Their first exhibition actually took place at Berlin's National Exhibition Building (now known as ULAP) early in 1893.

Baurat (city construction supervisor) Franz von Brandl provided the secession with some free land at the corner of Prinzregentenstraße and Pilotystraße. Construction began immediately and their debut exhibition took place on 16 July 1893, in the first portion of the building to be completed. Over 4,000 visitors came to see 876 works by 297 artists.

The success of this effort eventually allowed them to come to an agreement with Franz von Lenbach and the Artists' Association. As a result, the art exhibition building on the Königsplatz (now the Staatliche Antikensammlungen) was transferred to the secession in 1897.

Of note, several important artists of the period such as Gabriel von Max, Lovis Corinth, Lesser Ury, Otto Pippel and Adolf Frey-Moock exhibited with the Munich Secession and considered themselves as members of the movement; but were neither founding members nor on the administrative board officially.

== Later history ==
In 1933, the National Socialist party began their crusade to bring all forms of artistic expression under their control: a process known as Gleichschaltung (bringing into line). Artists were eventually required to obtain state endorsement for all of their works. Those who were considered "degenerate" were not allowed to paint. In 1938, the Munich Secession was dissolved as part of the Kulturellen Säuberung (cultural cleansing) process.

Following the end of World War II in 1946, the Neue Gruppe and the Neue Münchner Künstlergenossenschaft (New Munich Artists' Association) were founded and led to the establishment of the Bundesverband Bildender Künstlerinnen und Künstler (Federal Association of Visual Artists).

In 1992, the secession celebrated its centennial and, in March of the following year, the Society of Friends and Sponsors of the Munich Secession was created to support the secession's continuing goals, maintain the Secessionsgalerie and promote exhibitions.

== Founding members of the secession's board ==
- Bernhard Buttersack
- Ludwig Dill
- Bruno Piglhein, first president
- Ludwig von Herterich
- Paul Hoecker, first secretary
- Albert von Keller
- Gotthardt Kuehl
- Hugo von Habermann, second president
- Robert Poetzelberger, second secretary
- Franz von Stuck
- Fritz von Uhde
- Heinrich von Zügel

== Further reading and documentary materials ==
- Offizieller Katalog der Internationalen Kunst-Ausstellung des Vereins bildender Künstler Münchens (A. V.) "Secession" 1898. Vierte Auflage. Bruckmann, Munich 1898. — Full text.
- Offizieller Katalog der Internationalen Kunst-Ausstellung des Vereins bildender Künstler Münchens (E. V.) "Secession" 1906. Zweite Auflage. Bruckmann, Munich 1906. — Full text.
- Offizieller Katalog der Internationalen Kunst-Ausstellung des Vereins bildender Künstler Münchens (E. V.) "Secession" 1908. Zweite Auflage. Bruckmann, Munich 1908. — Full text.
- Münchener Kunst-Ausstellung 1917, verbunden mit einer kunstgewerblichen Abteilung zugunsten der Nationalsammlung für die Hinterbliebenen der gefallenen Krieger im königlichen Glaspalast. Veranstaltet von Münchener Künstlergenossenschaft und der Secession, 1. Juli bis Ende September. Offizieller Katalog. Verlag der Münchener Künstlergenossenschaft und Secession, Munich 1917. — Digital collections.
- Bernd Dürr: Leo Putz, Max Feldbauer und der Kreis der "Scholle" und die "Jugend" in Dachau um 1900. Catalog of the "Upper Bavarian Cultural Days" exhibit in Dachau (1989). Kreis- und Stadtsparkasse Dachau-Indersdorf, Dachau 1989.
- Markus Harzenetter: Zur Münchner Secession. Genese, Ursachen und Zielsetzungen dieser intentionell neuartigen Münchner Künstlervereinigung. "Miscellanea Bavarica Monacensia", Vol. 158, ZDB-ID 846909-x. Kommissionsverlag UNI-Druck, Munich 1992, ISBN 3-87821-281-X. (Based on a dissertation for the University of Bamberg, 1991).
- Maria Makela: The Munich Secession. Art and Artists in Turn-Of-The-Century Munich, (Princeton, New Jersey: Princeton University Press, 1990), ISBN 0-691-03982-8. (Based on a dissertation submitted to Stanford University, 1987).
- Norbert Hierl-Deronco, Otto Hierl-Deronco (Ill.): Münchener Secession 1892. Otto Barone Hierl-Deronco, Maler und Mitbegründer, 1859–1935. Hierl-Deronco, Krailling vor München 1994, ISBN 3-929884-04-6.
- Ruth Stein: Die Münchener Secession um 1900. Exhibition catalog. Galerie Konrad Bayer, Munich 1996.
- Jochen Meister, Bettina Best, Andreas Strobl: Münchener Secession. Geschichte und Gegenwart. Prestel-Verlag, Munich 2007, ISBN 978-3-7913-3877-4.
- Michael Buhrs, Bettina Best: Secession 1892–1914. Die Münchner Secession 1892–1914. Edition Minerva, Wolfratshausen 2008, ISBN 978-3-938832-33-2. – Contents (PDF).
