= Gotthardt Kuehl =

German painter

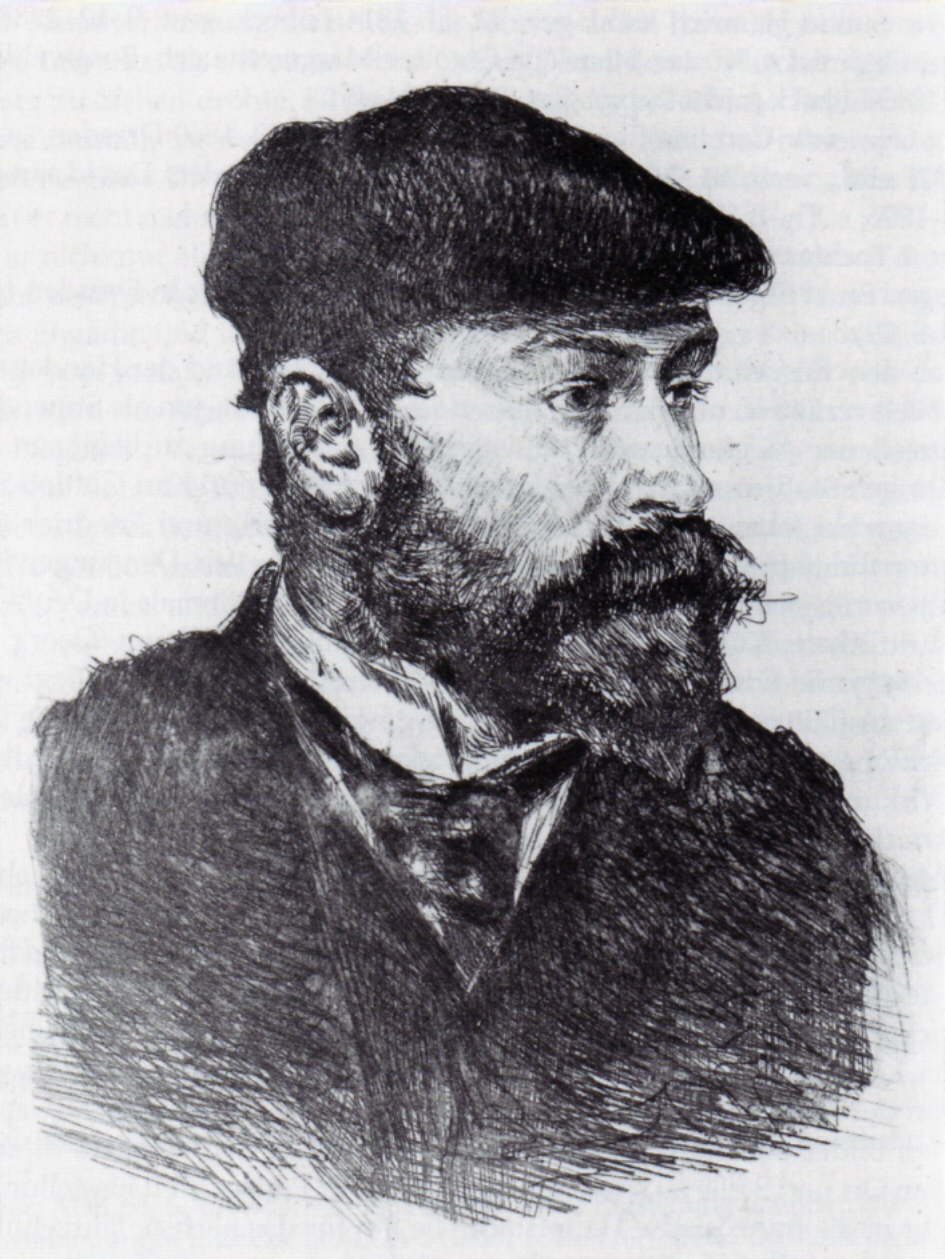
- Self-portrait (1892)
- Born: 28 November 1850; Lübeck, German Confederation
- Died: 9 January 1915 (aged 64); Dresden, German Empire
- Education: Dresden Academy of Fine Arts; Academy of Fine Arts, Munich
- Known for: Painting
- Movement: Impressionism

Gotthardt Kuehl (28 November 1850 – 9 January 1915) was a German painter and a representative of early German Impressionism. He gained wide international recognition during his lifetime.

== Life and work ==
His father, Simon Kühl, was the Sexton and organist at St. Lorenz Church. He studied at the Dresden Academy of Fine Arts (1867) and the Academy of Fine Arts, Munich, (1870). From 1878 to 1889, he lived in Paris. He also made study trips to Italy and the Netherlands. In 1888, he married Henriette Simonson-Castelli (1860–1921), daughter of the portrait painter, David Simonson.

At the turn of the century, he and Carl Bantzer, a friend from Paris, were the driving forces behind the establishment of the Verein bildender Künstler Dresden (artists' association). Together, they were also influential in introducing Impressionism there. In 1895, he was named a Professor at the Academy. The following year, he was awarded a gold medal at the Große Berliner Kunstausstellung. In 1902, he was one of the founding members of another artists' association, "Die Elbier". He also served as one of the first board members of the Deutschen Künstlerbundes. In 1913, he was honored with the Bavarian Maximilian Order for Science and Art.

From 1906 until his death, he lived in a villa near the Wasaplatz. He was cremated and placed in the Urnenhain Tolkewitz. A street has been named for him in Dresden's Strehlen district. in Lübeck a school, originally on the site of his parents' house, was named after him in 1934.

== Art collections ==
The Behnhaus museum in Lübeck has a collection of paintings by Kuehl, illustrating almost all his developmental phases, and many of the artworks are directly related to the city of Lübeck. The Munich City Museum houses 15 drawings by Kuehl, from the collection of Joseph Maximilian von Maillinger.

Other works of art by Kuehl can be found, among other places, at:

- Old National Gallery in Berlin
- Kunsthalle Hamburg
- New Masters Gallery (Dresden State Art Collections)
- Museum of Fine Arts in Leipzig
- Pomeranian State Museum in Greifswald
- Museum Kunstpalast in Düsseldorf
- Lower Saxony State Museum in Hanover
- Dresden City Art Gallery

== Selected paintings ==
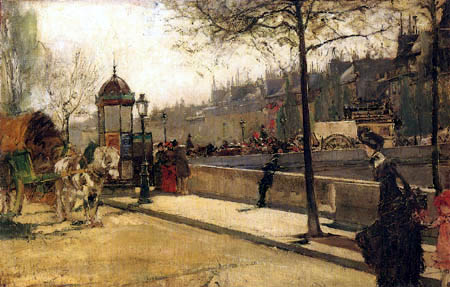
Parisian quay, 1885

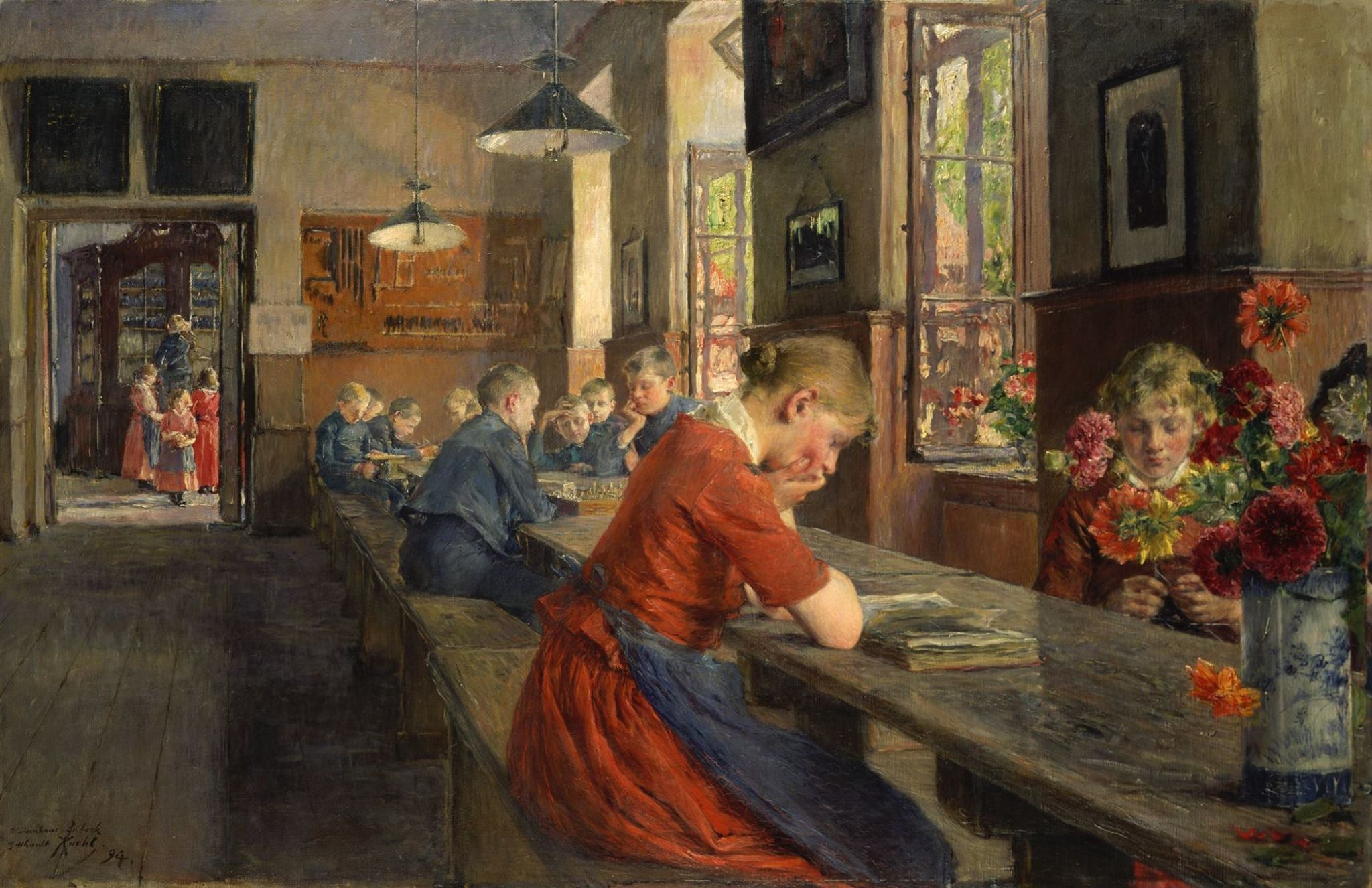
Lübeck orphanage, 1894

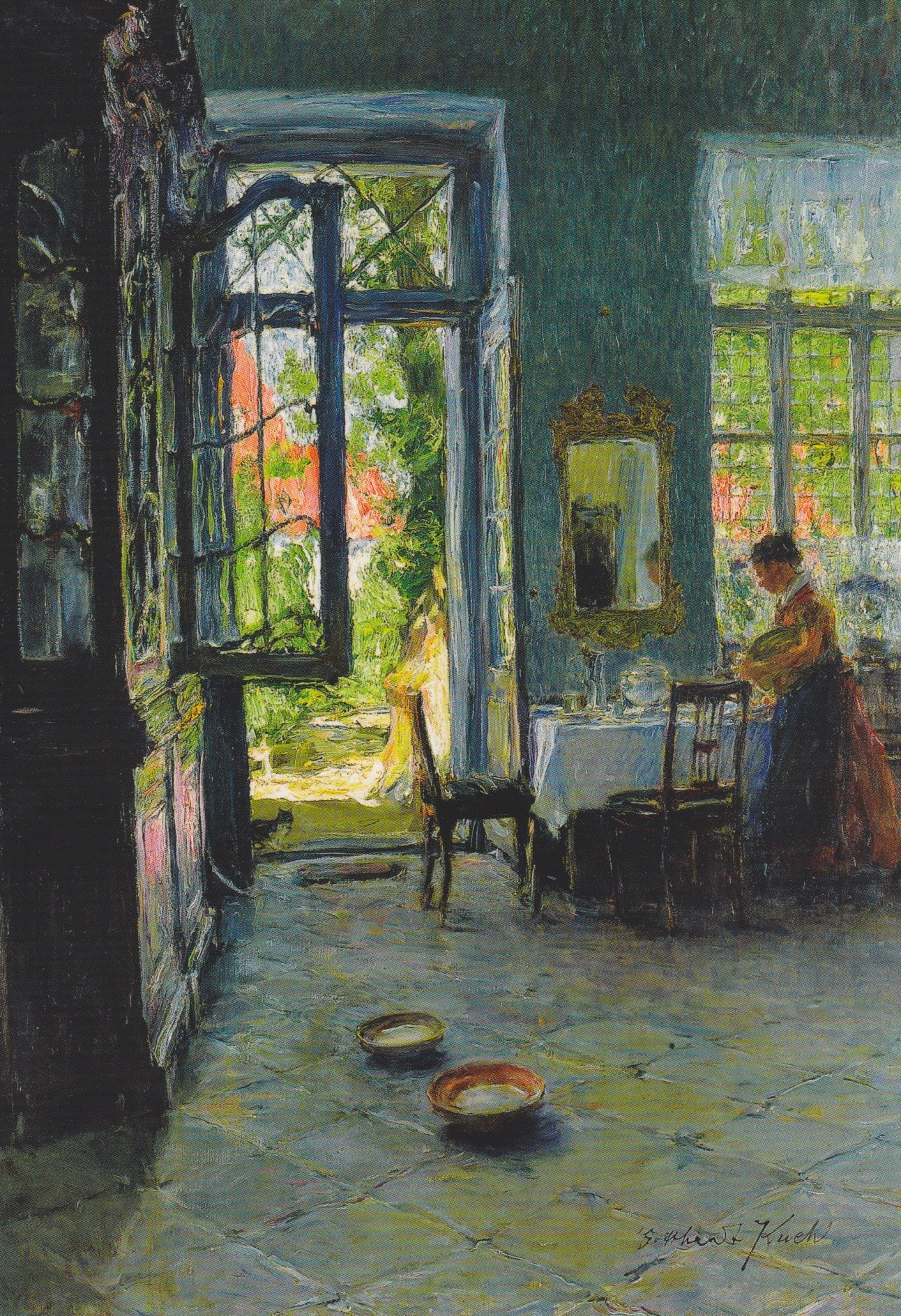
Garden room, 1897

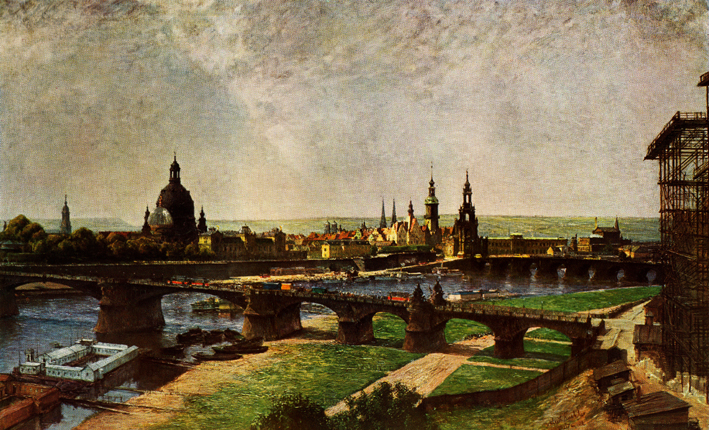
View of Dresden, 1902

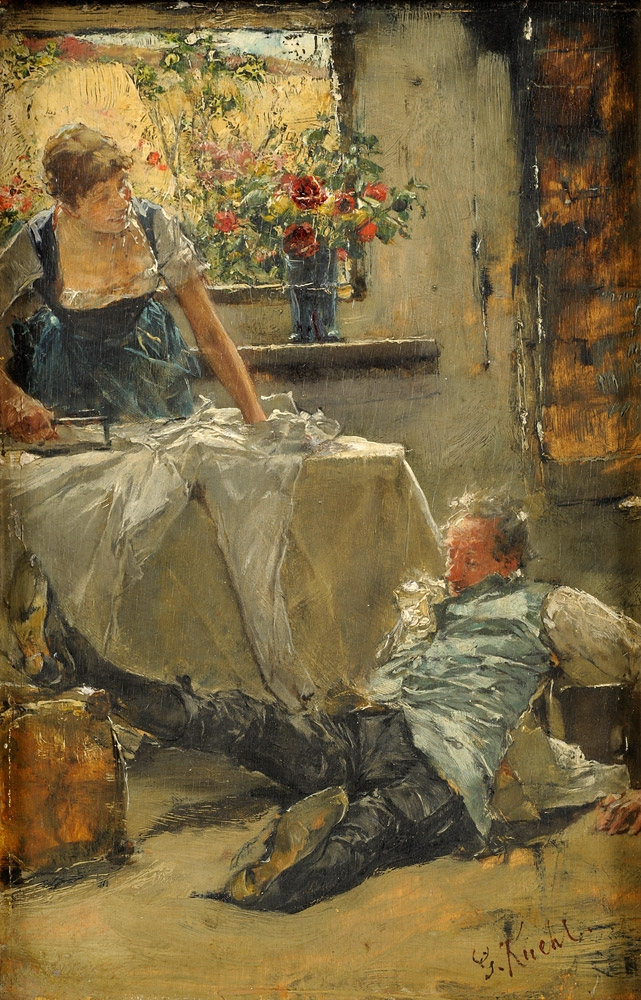
Small Accident, by 1905

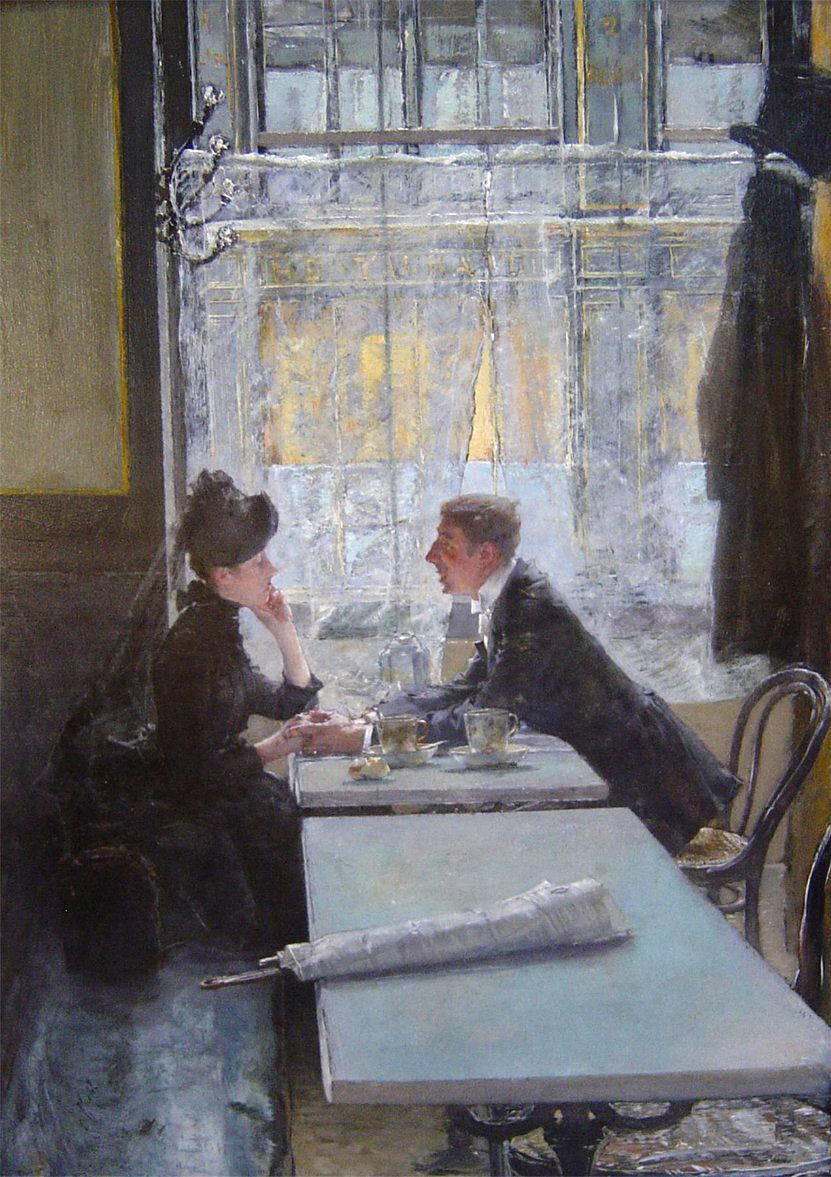
In the Coffeehouse, by 1915

== Sources ==
- Gerhard Gerkens (Ed.), Gotthardt Kuehl 1850–1915. Seemann, Leipzig 1993.
- Kurt Pilz (1982). "Kuehl, Gotthardt". Neue Deutsche Biographie (in German). Vol. 13. Berlin: Duncker & Humblot. pp. 187–188. (full text online).
- Emil Richter, Gotthardt Kuehl: Kunstausstellung ("Gotthardt Kuehl: Art exhibition"), Dresden 1920.
- Wulf Schadendorf: Museum Behnhaus. Das Haus und seine Räume. Malerei, Skulptur, Kunsthandwerk ("Museum Behnhaus. The house and its rooms: Paintings, sculptures, crafts") (Lübeck museum catalogs, vol. 3). Expanded and revised edition. Museum of Art and Cultural History of the Hanseatic city of Lübeck, 1976, pp. 78–80.
