= Robert Pötzelberger =

Austrian artist (1856–1930)

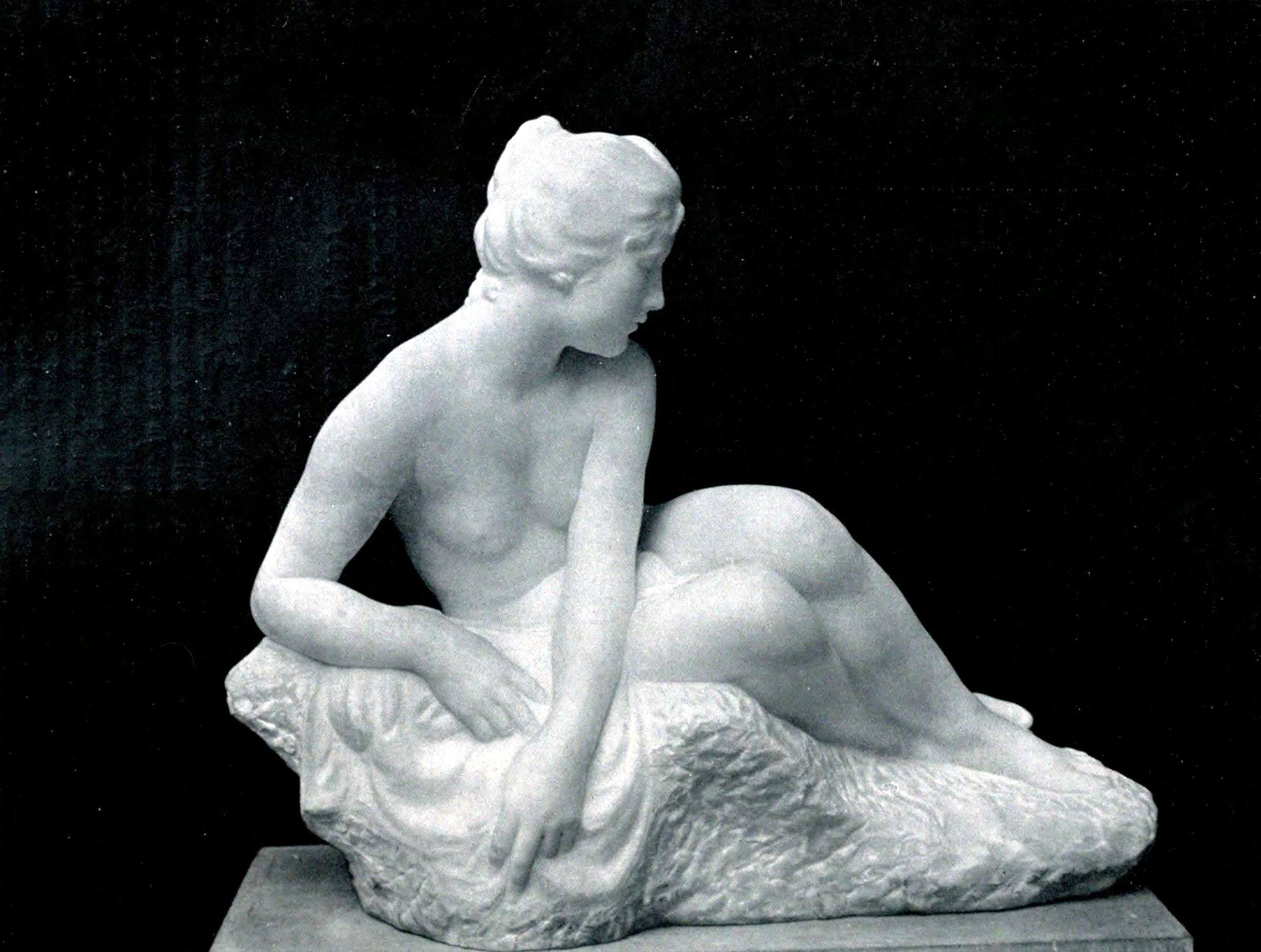
Susanna

Robert Pötzelberger (9 June 1856, in Vienna – 2 August 1930, in Reichenau, Baden-Württemberg) was an Austrian painter, sculptor and lithographer.

== Life ==
Pötzelberger studied at the Academy of Fine Arts, Vienna between 1875 and 1879 under Leopold Carl Müller. After this education, he became a professor at the Academy of Fine Arts, Munich in 1880, staying until 1892; then, a professor at the Academy of Fine Arts, Karlsruhe until 1899; and then at the State Academy of Fine Arts Stuttgart until his retirement in 1926. His students included Friedrich Mißfeldt in Karlsruhe and Willi Baumeister in Stuttgart. He was a founding member of the Vienna Secession.

Influenced by academic styles French impressionism, he created many historical works, but also looked to the natural world of South Germany and Austria for inspiration.

His son, Oswald Poetzelberger, was also a painter.
