= Dachau Artists' Colony =

Art colony in Dachau, Germany

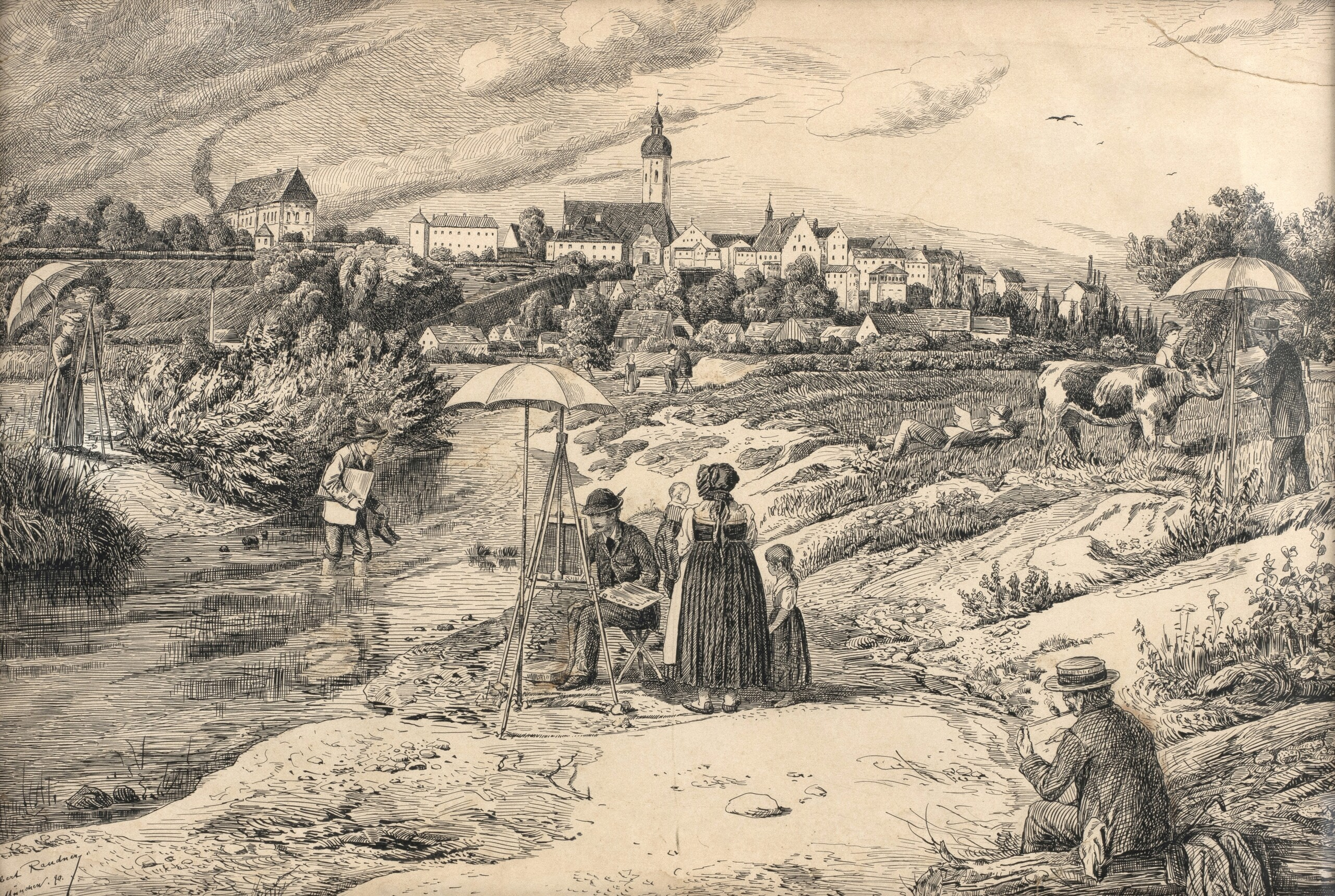
Robert Hermann Raudner, Artists Near Dachau (1890)

The Dachau Artists' Colony was located in Dachau, Germany, and flourished from around 1890 until 1914.

== History ==
In the early 19th century, the then-bucolic village of Dachau (located just 12 miles from Munich) began attracting landscape painters. By the second half of the century, Barbizon-influenced painters like Carl Spitzweg and Christian Morgenstern, and academic painters like Wilhelm von Diez and Eduard Schleich the Elder had worked in and around Dachau.

A new era opened in 1888 when the German painter Adolf Hölzel moved to Dachau. In 1897 he and several other avant-garde artists — notably Ludwig Dill and Arthur Langhammer — set up the "New Dachau" art school in Dachau that attracted artists from all over Europe, especially rural genre painters, landscape painters, and printmakers. Many stayed and formed a colony, drawn both by the picturesque surrounding moors stretching to the distant Alps and by the lower cost of living than in nearby Munich. Among those drawn to the artists' colony were Fritz von Uhde, Walther Klemm, Gertrud Staats, and Carl Thiemann. The architect Georg Ludwig designed a group of residences for Dachau artists.

The new colony achieved national recognition in 1898 when Hölzel, Dill, and Langhammer mounted a joint exhibition in Berlin under the title "The Dachauer". So many artists passed through Dachau during its first fifteen years that certain subjects and views were reproduced repeatedly. One especially popular subject was an old cottage surrounded by ancient poplars, known as the 'Moss Hut' (Moosschwaige). The nearby moorland, called the Dachauer Moos, was another popular subject.

The heyday of the colony lasted only until 1914, when many artists left to join the military during World War I and never returned. In addition, new developments in art during the postwar era — especially the rise of urban and industrial subjects — began to leave Dachau colony artists behind. After World War II, the art colony was nearly forgotten as Dachau became associated in most people's minds above all with the Dachau concentration camp.

== See also ==
- Art colony
