= Gertrud Staats =

German painter (1859–1938)

- Born: 21 February 1859; Wrocław, Kingdom of Prussia
- Died: 21 June 1938 (aged 79); Wrocław
- Known for: Painting

Gertrud Staats (1859–1938) was a German painter and founder of Vereinigung Schlesischer Kűnstlerinnen. She was known for her landscapes.

== Biography ==
Staats was born on 21 February 1859 in Wrocław. She received her first training from Adolf Dressler. She also studied with Hans Gude and Franz Skarbina in Berlin. She was acquainted artists from the Neu-Dachau (New Dachau) including Adolf Hölzel and Ludwig Dill. Staats incorporated the styles of Romantic realism, Impressionism, Art Nouveau and Expressionism.

She exhibited her paintings in Berlin from 1881 through 1912, and in Munich from 1888 through 1908. She also exhibited in Vienna, Dresden, Hamburg, Bremen, Gdańsk, and Bytom.

Staats exhibited her work at the Palace of Fine Arts and The Woman's Building at the 1893 World's Columbian Exposition in Chicago, Illinois.

In 1902 Staats founded the Vereinigung Schlesischer Kűnstlerinnen, the Association of Silesian Artists.

In the early 20th century Staats was considered one of the major Silesian landscape painters. After World War I she shifted her focus from landscape painting to flower and still life painting.

Staats died on 21 June 1938 in Wrocław.

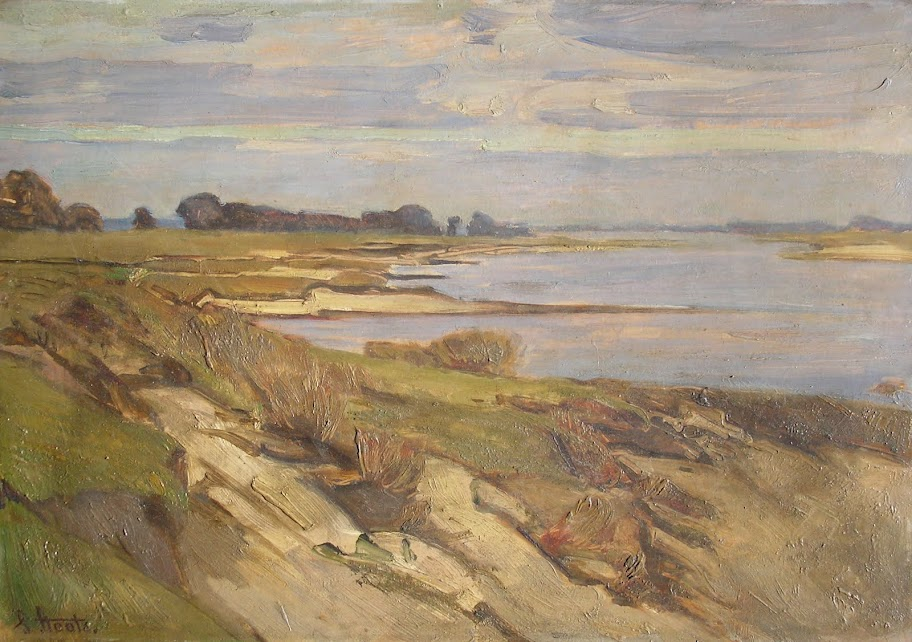
Landscape, Gertrud Staats

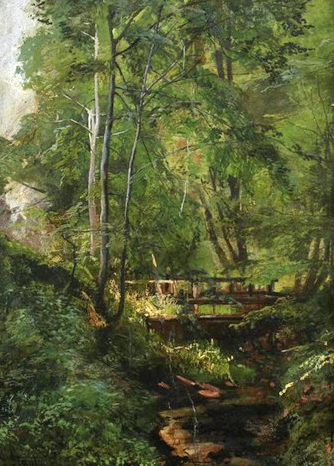
Footbridge over woodland stream, Gertrud Staats

== Legacy ==
Staats' paintings are in the National Museum, Warsaw, and the Karkonosze Museum in Jelenia Gora. In 2018 the Royal Palace in Wrocław held a retrospective exhibition of Staats' paintings.
