= Fritz von Uhde =

German painter (1848–1911)

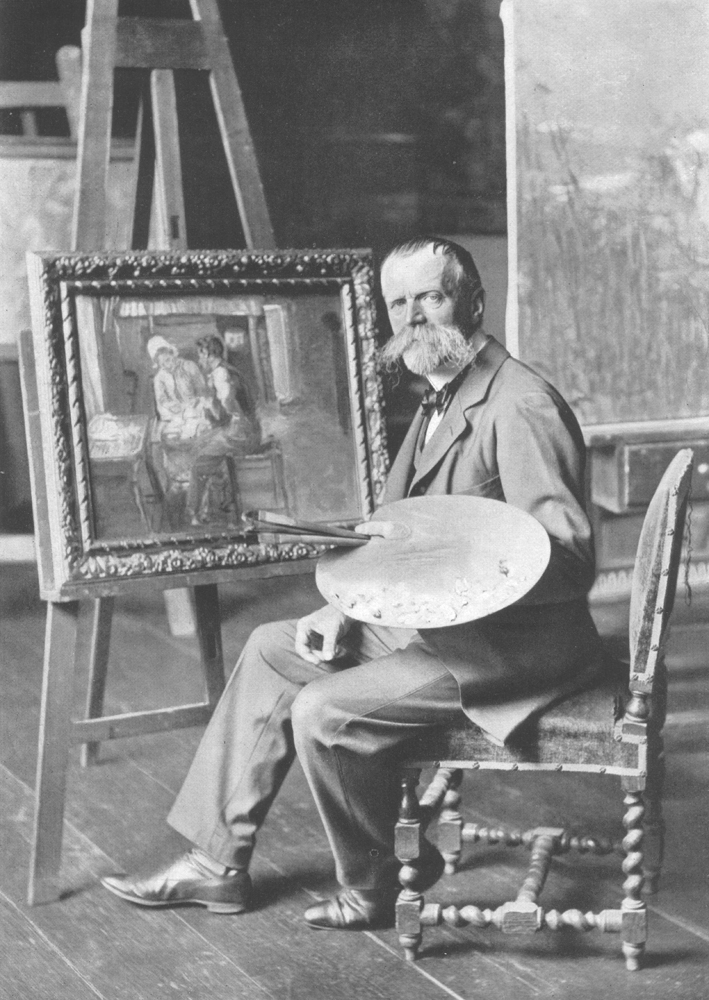
Uhde in 1902

Fritz von Uhde (born Friedrich Hermann Carl Uhde; 22 May 1848 – 25 February 1911) was a German painter of genre and religious subjects. His style lay in-between Realism and Impressionism, he was once known as "Germany's outstanding impressionist" and he became one of the first painters to introduce plein-air painting in his country.

== Biography ==
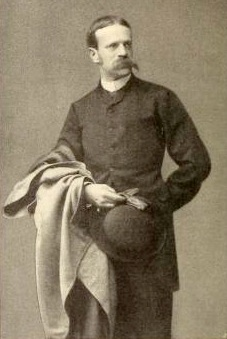
Uhde, young

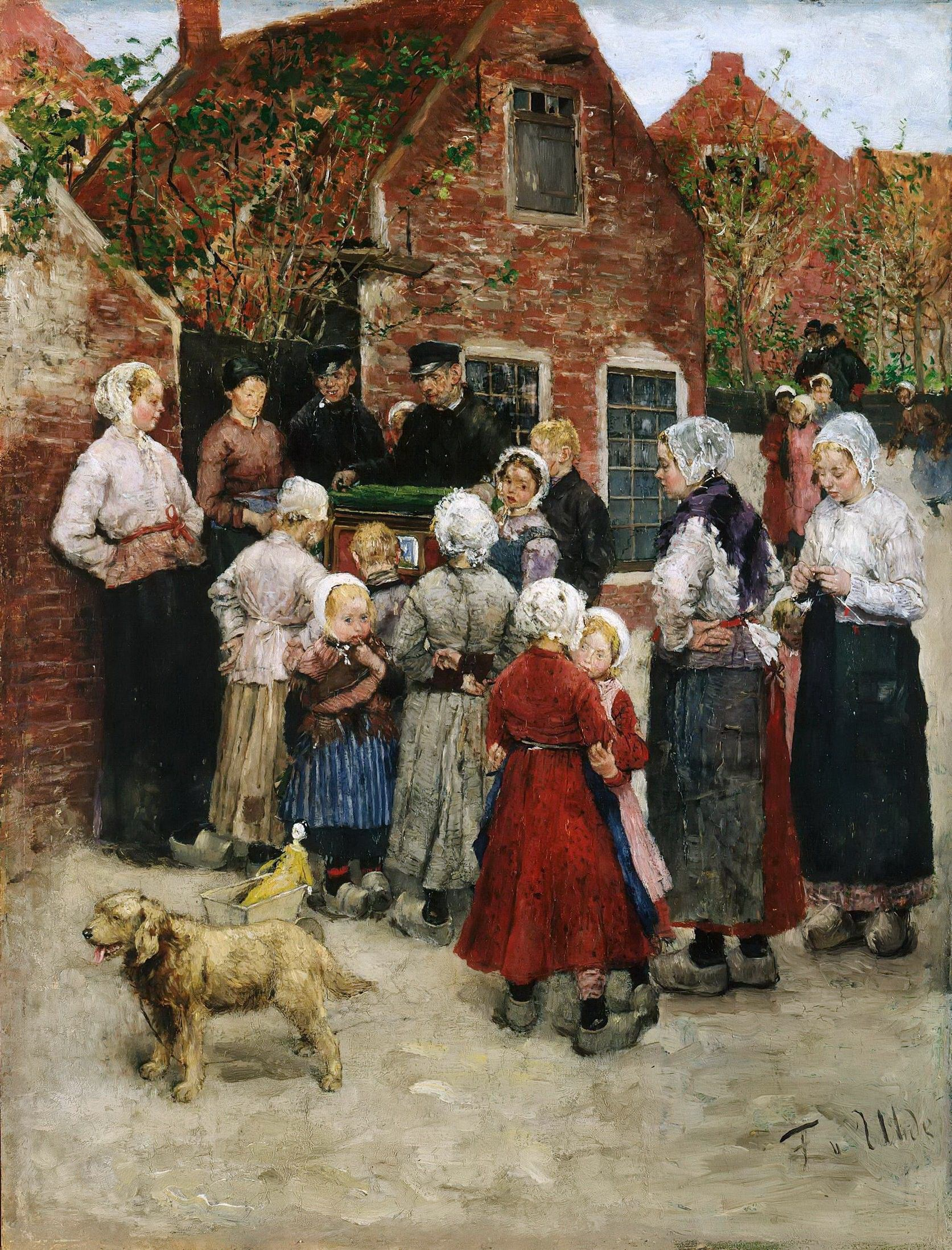
Organ Grinder in Zandvoort, 1883, Alte Nationalgalerie Berlin

Uhde was born in Wolkenburg, Saxony. His family, moderately wealthy civil servants, had artistic interests. His father was actually a part-time painter and his maternal grandfather was director of the Royal Museums in Dresden. Uhde found art appealing while studying at the Gymnasium at this city, and in 1866 he was admitted to the Academy of Fine Arts in Dresden. Totally at variance with the spirit prevailing there, later that year he left his studies to join the army. He became horsemanship instructor to the regiment of the assembled guard, and was promoted to Lieutenant in 1868.

After meeting the painter Makart in Vienna in 1876, Uhde left the army in 1877 with the intention to become an artist. He moved to Munich in that year to attend the Academy of Fine Arts. There, he particularly came to admire the Dutch old masters, especially Rembrandt. He also taught Lilla Cabot Perry, influencing her use of color.

Unsuccessful in his attempts to gain admittance to the studios of Piloty, Lindenschmit, or Diez, in 1879 he traveled to Paris where his studies of the Dutch painters continued under Mihály Munkácsy's supervision. He worked for a short time in that master's studio, but principally studied from nature and his old Netherland models. As a late starter in his art studies, he was determined to succeed quickly. The final work he painted at Munkácsy's school, The Singer, was exhibited in the Paris Salon of 1880, where it was awarded an honorable mention.

In 1882 a journey to the Netherlands brought about a change in his style, as he abandoned the dark chiaroscuro he had learned in Munich in favor of a colorism informed by the works of the French Impressionists. Encouraged by his contemporary Max Liebermann, whose portrait he painted, Uhde painted Fishermen's Children in Zandvoort (1882) as an experiment in plein-air painting, but chose to exhibit a more conventional version of the composition, the Arrival of the Organ-Grinder (1883; Kunsthalle Hamburg). This conflict between innovation and caution characterized the greater part of his career.

In about 1890, Uhde became a professor at the Academy of Fine Arts in Munich. He was, with Max Slevogt, Ludwig Dill and Lovis Corinth, one of the founding members of the Verein Bildender Künstler (Society of Fine Artists), better known as the Munich Secession. He later joined the Berlin Secession as well.

Uhde became an honorary member of the academies of Munich, Dresden and Berlin. He became the first President of the Secession, and progressing in his naturalistic conception, he came to develop his own "unacademic" syle. He gave rise to a complete change in German art, and counted among his followers most of the younger generation. Adolf Hölzel was influenced by him in his early work.

He became less active in the art world after 1900, but continued to paint until his last days. This was the time when, in the opinion of Charles & Carl, he created "the most vivid and artistic paintings of his career", so that he can be considered "one of the most important artists of the 20th century". He died in Munich in 1911.

== Work ==
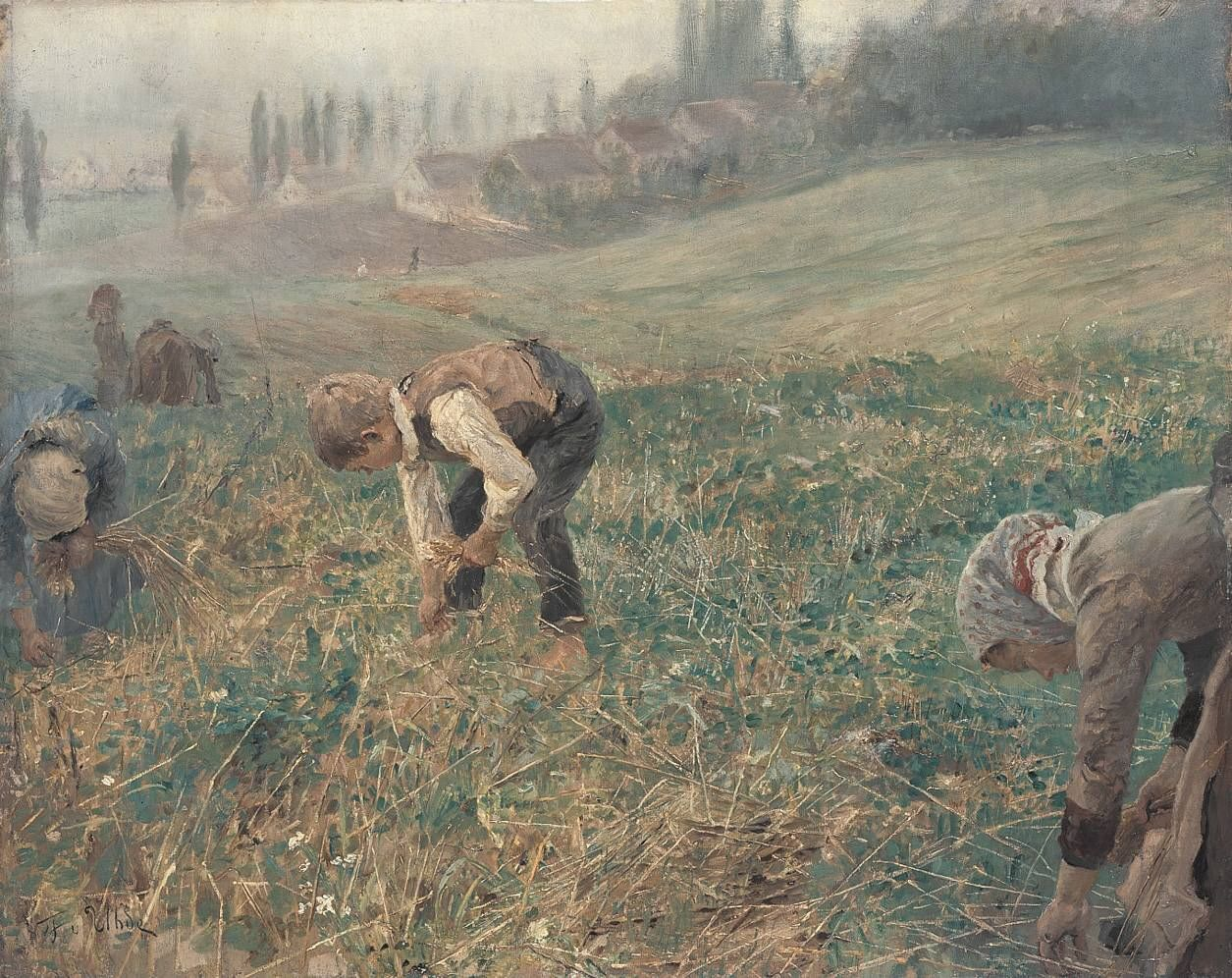
Die Ährenleser (1889)

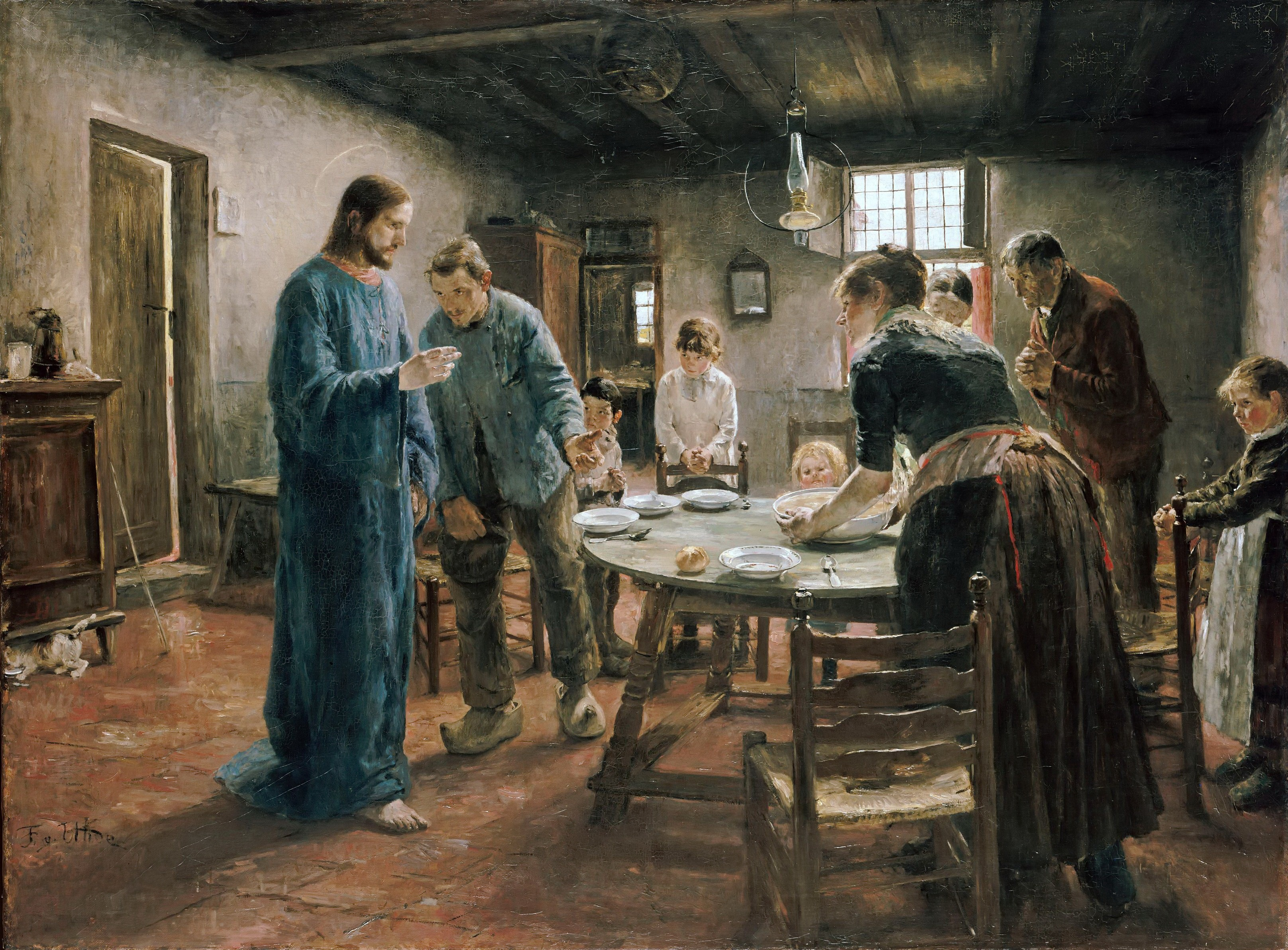
The Mealtime Prayer or Grace before the Meal (1885)

His early work consisted of landscapes and battle pieces, but Uhde's inclination was later almost solely directed towards genre art and religious subjects. His father had been the President of the Lutheran Church Council in Wolkenburg, Saxony, and Uhde shared his father's Christian commitment.

Although the social realism of Uhde's work was often criticized as vulgar or ugly, his paintings also attracted the admiration of others. His work was well known to the French public. Vincent van Gogh mentioned Uhde in personal correspondence. The critic Otto Julius Bierbaum, who prepared a biographical writing of him, said "as a painter of children ... Uhde is extraordinarily distinguished. He does not depict them ... as amusing or charming dolls, but with extreme, very strict naturalness." Revivalist of the practice of treating Biblical episodes realistically by transferring them to modern days, Uhde's work was also appreciated by others who praised his symbolic message and sense of evangelical morality.

In his work, Uhde often depicted the ordinary lives of families of peasants, fishermen, and seamstresses; children and youngsters, as well as young and old women. He chose both indoor and outdoor settings, with detailed and ordinary surroundings, and often natural colorful landscapes. In addition, he frequently depicted Jesus Christ as visiting common people, poor people and working class or proletarian families in settings of his country. Like Adolf Hölzel and Ludwig Dill, he painted rural life and his work has been described as "rustic naturalism".

One of his well-known paintings was Come, Lord Jesus, be our Guest (Komm, Herr Jesus, sei unser Gast), of the Berlin National Gallery, where Christ appears among the peasant family assembled for their meal in a modern German farmhouse "parlor". This work was especially criticized by some Catholics who saw it as a "desecration" of Christ, whereas R. A. Cram wrote that by painting "Christ among the common people here and now" Uhde had "built up a most significant art." The religious content has been seen as "a vehicle for his quest to endow his work with deeper meaning". According to the art historian Bettina Brand, Uhde's work was controversial partly because "setting episodes from the Gospels in the context of contemporary poverty ... suggested that the Christian demand of equality for all men had not been met politically or socially." Besides this, his religious paintings "seemed to document the cultural and ethical progressivenes of Protestantism against the clericalism of the Catholic Church."

Religious paintings where Christ appears among common people

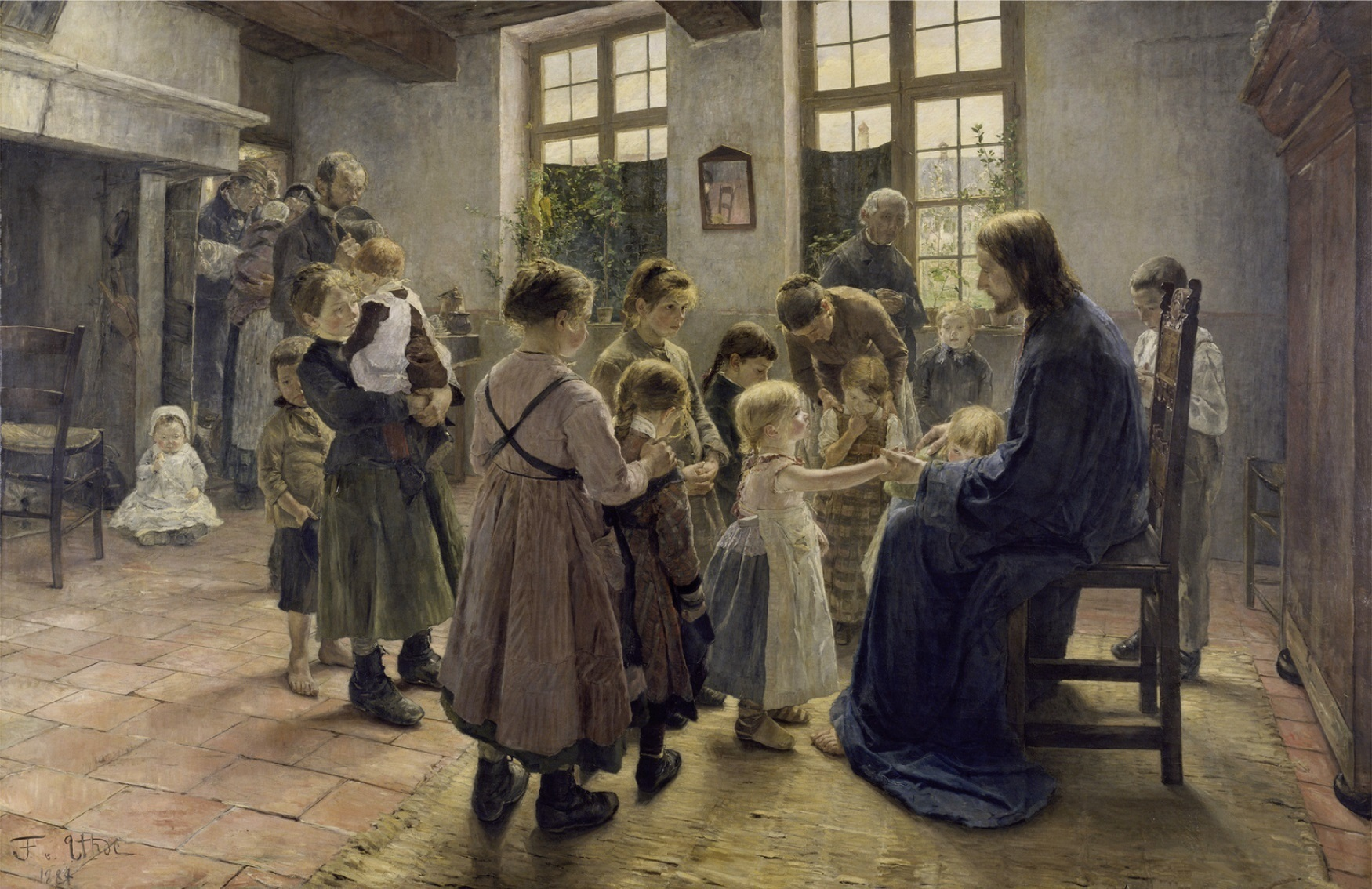
Let the little children come to me (1883)

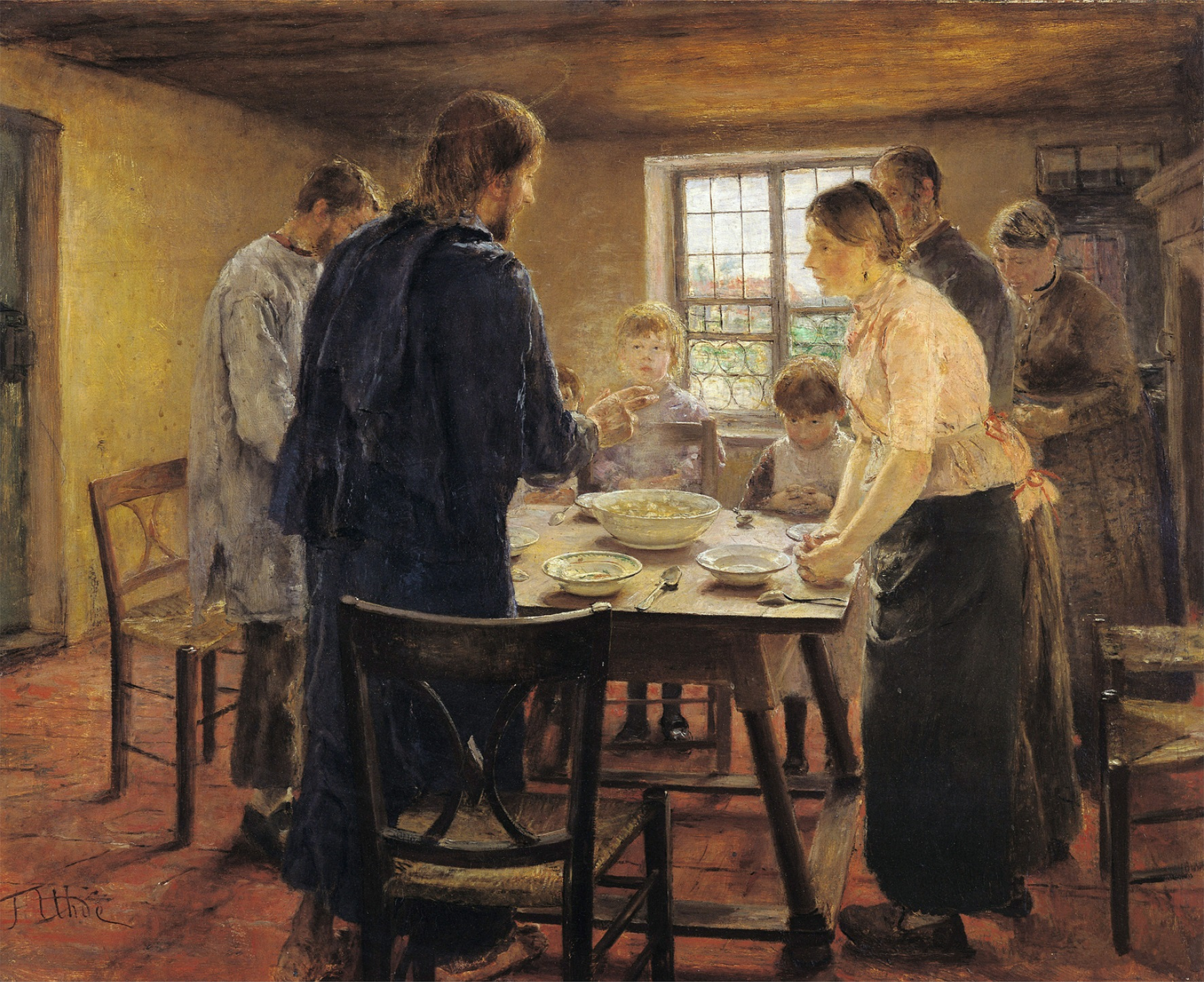
Christ with a Farm Family (c. 1887–88)

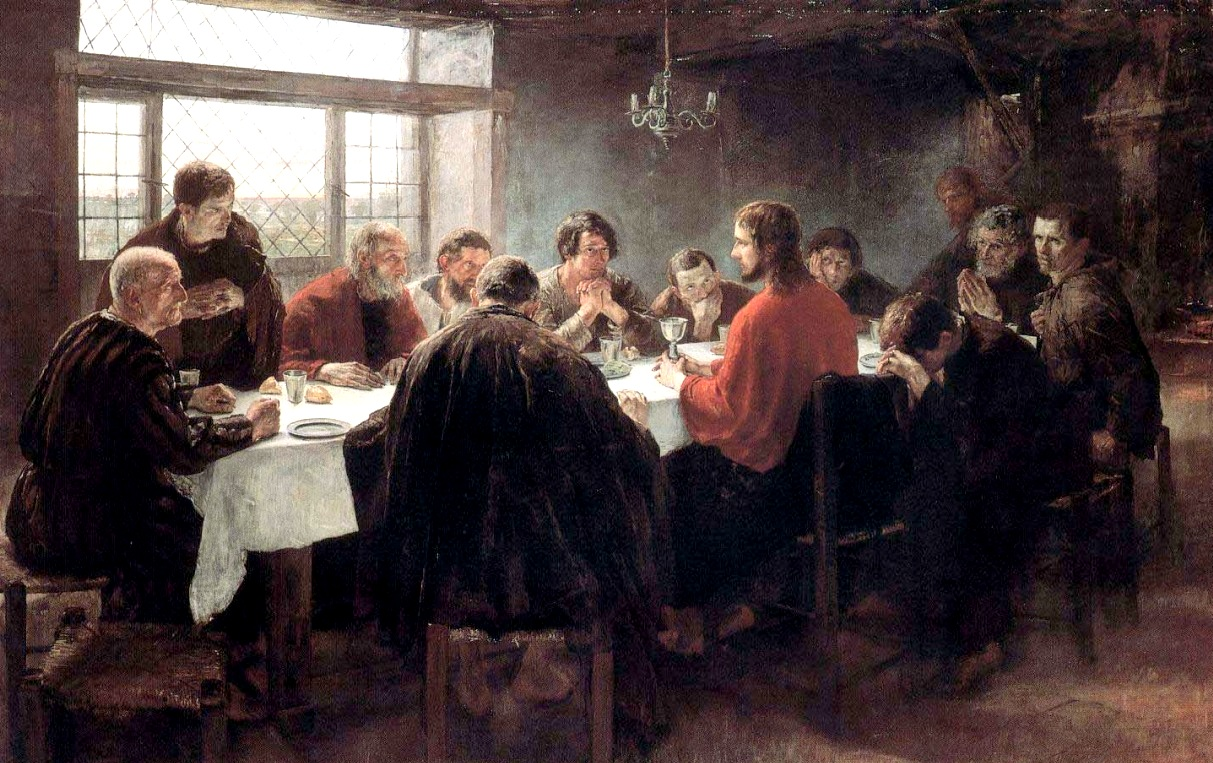
The Last Supper (1886)

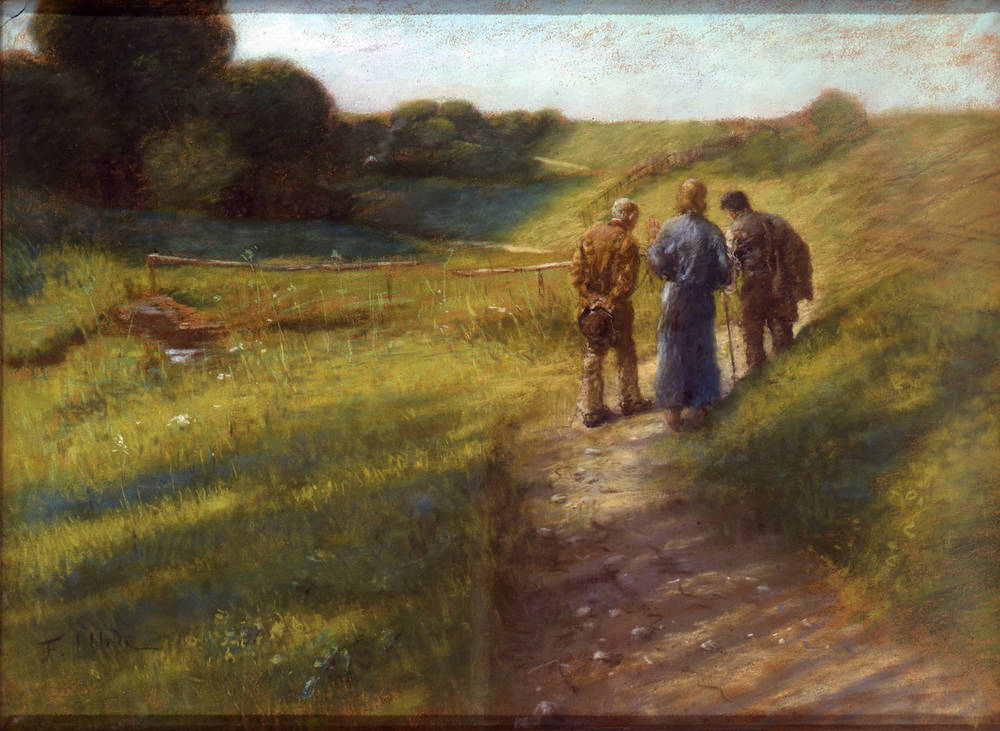
Road to Emmaus (1891)

== Style ==
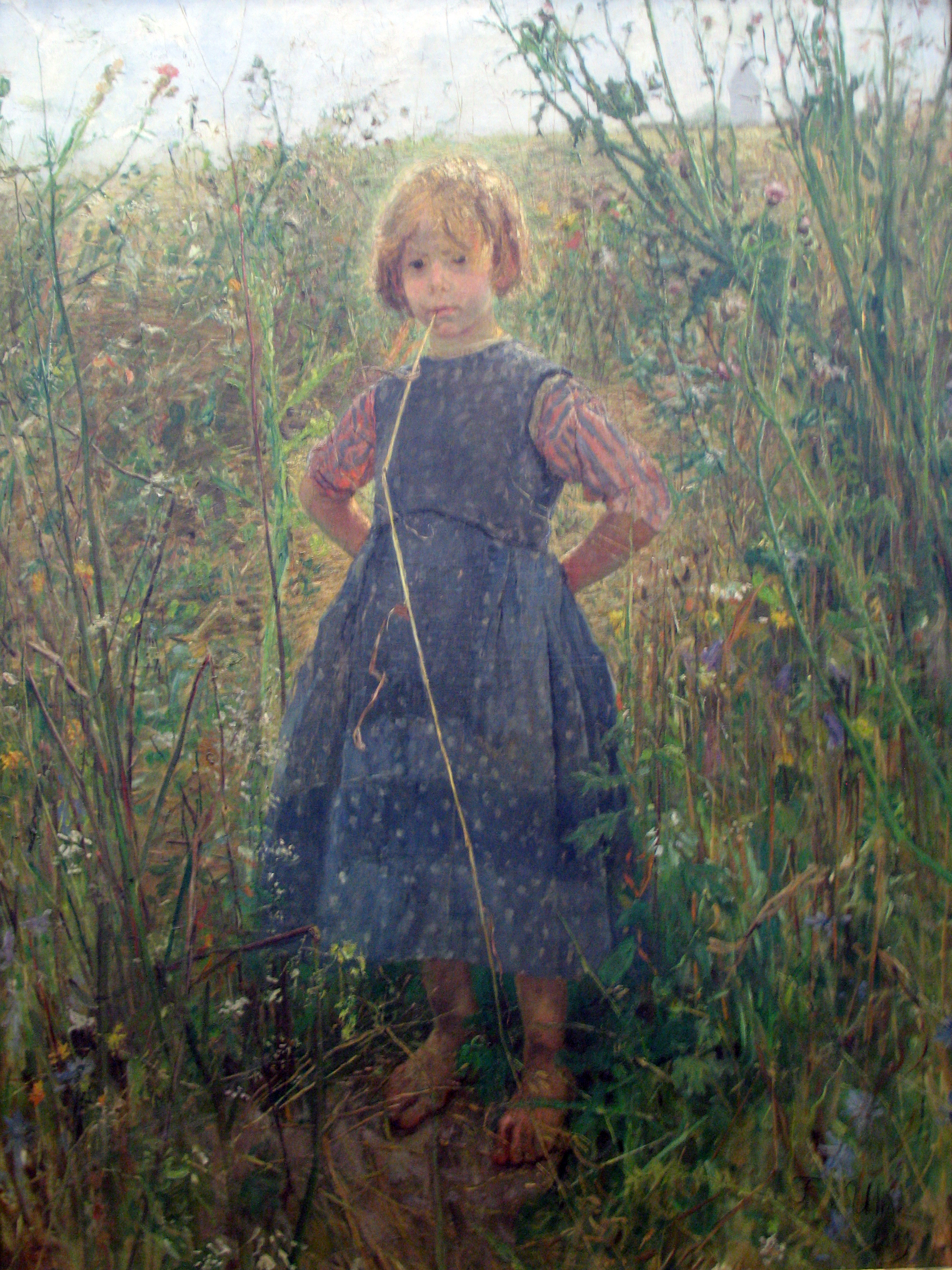
Heideprinzeßchen (Heathland Princess or The little princess of the heath), 1889

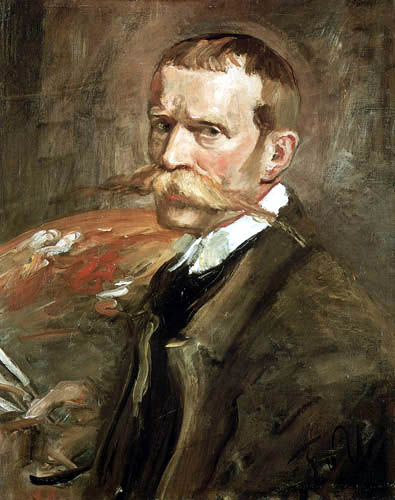
Self-portrait (1898)

In general, Uhde was an unconventional naturalist, as he said: "many of the French artists wished to find the light in Nature. I wished to find the light within the figure that I was presenting. In Christ I grasped the embodiment of the outward and the inward light." Like Dostoyevsky, Uhde's concept of beauty and standard of perfection was the figure of Christ, a reason why he considered himself the "first Idealist of Naturalism."

In The Sermon on the Mount (Hungarian National Gallery), Christ addresses a crowd of 19th-century harvesters, whereas in Christus Predigt am see (Sermon at the Sea), Christ preaches to a group of modern youngsters. Similar in conception are Suffer Little Children to come unto Me (1884; Leipzig Museum), The Last Supper, The Journey to Bethlehem (Munich Pinakothek), and The Miraculous Draught of Fishes. Other works of his in public collections are: Christ Among the Peasants (the Musée d'Orsay, Paris); Christ at Emmaus & Road to Emmaus (the Staedel Institute, Frankfort); The Farewell of Tobias (the Liechtenstein Gallery, Vienna), Noli me tangere (1894; New Pinakothek, Munich), The Wise Men from the East (1896; Magdeburg Museum), and Woman, Why Weepest Thou? (1900; Vienna Museum).

After his wife's death in 1886, Uhde was very involved in the lives of his three daughters, whom he painted in numerous works such as Nursery (1889; Kunsthalle, Hamburg) and In the Bower (1896; Kunstmuseum, Düsseldorf). Works he painted during summers spent at Dachau and Starnberg in the 1890s show an increasingly Impressionistic rendering of sunlight, which is also evident in paintings Uhde made after the late 1890s of his daughters in the garden.

In his later years, he made paintings of a woman with wings of angels, and he reproduced some biblical scenes like Abraham's Trial (1897), The Last Supper (1897, Stuttgart Museum – which includes a portrait of the unworldly composer Anton Bruckner as one of the disciples),The Ascension of Christ (1898, New Pinakothek, Munich), Nicodemus and Christ, Die Bergpredigt, The Sermon (Die Predigt Christi, 1903), Tobias and the Angel, The Holy Night (1911, Dresden Gallery), and Christ Healing a Sick Child (1911).

=== Gallery ===
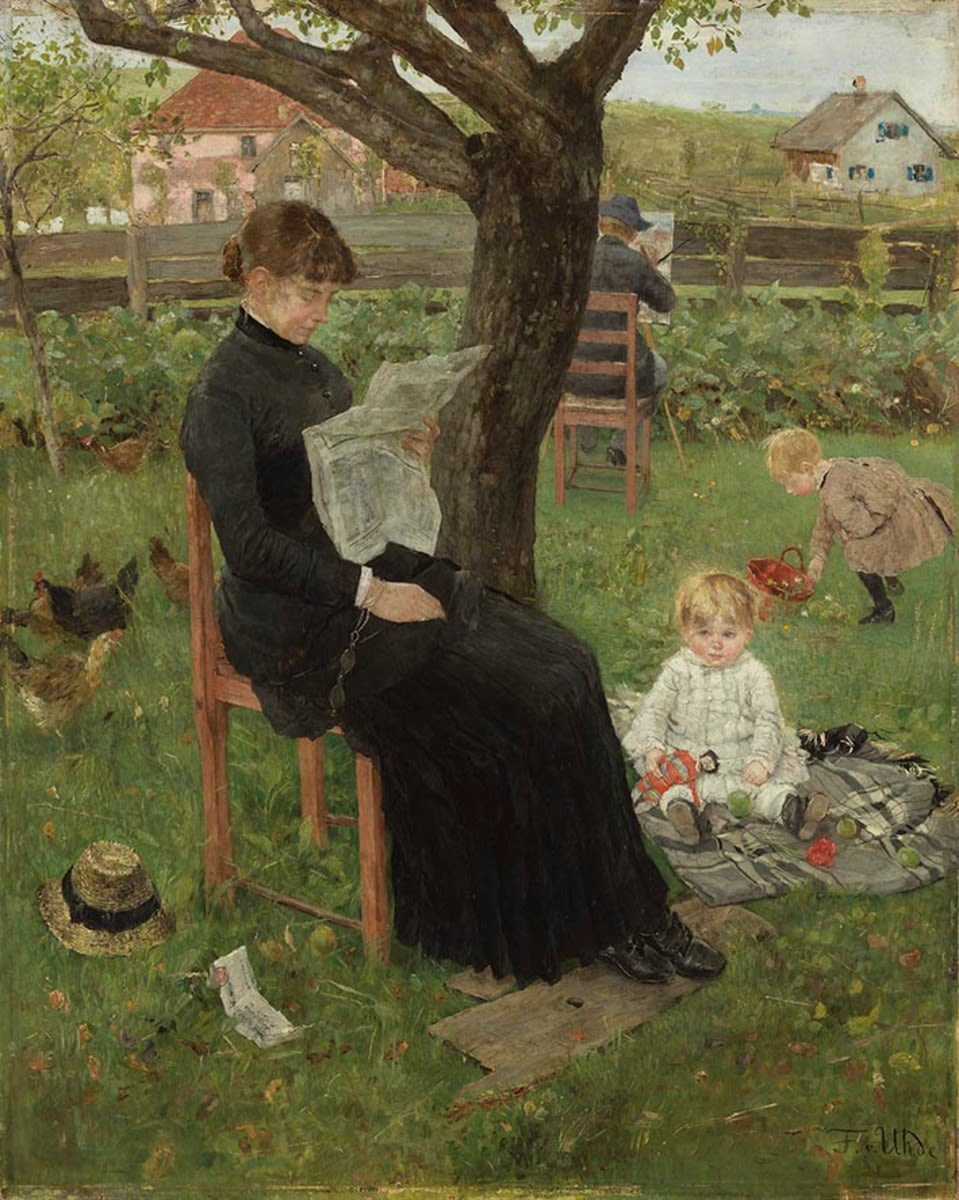
Summer Resort (1883)

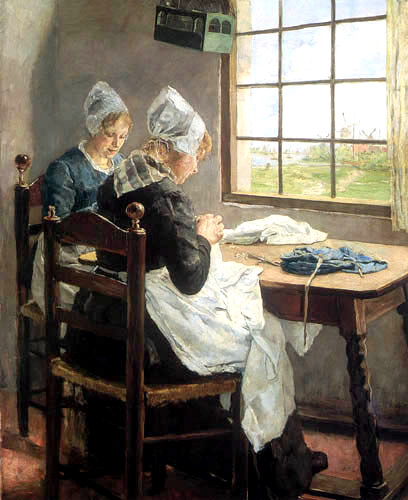
Sisters in the Sewing Room (1883)

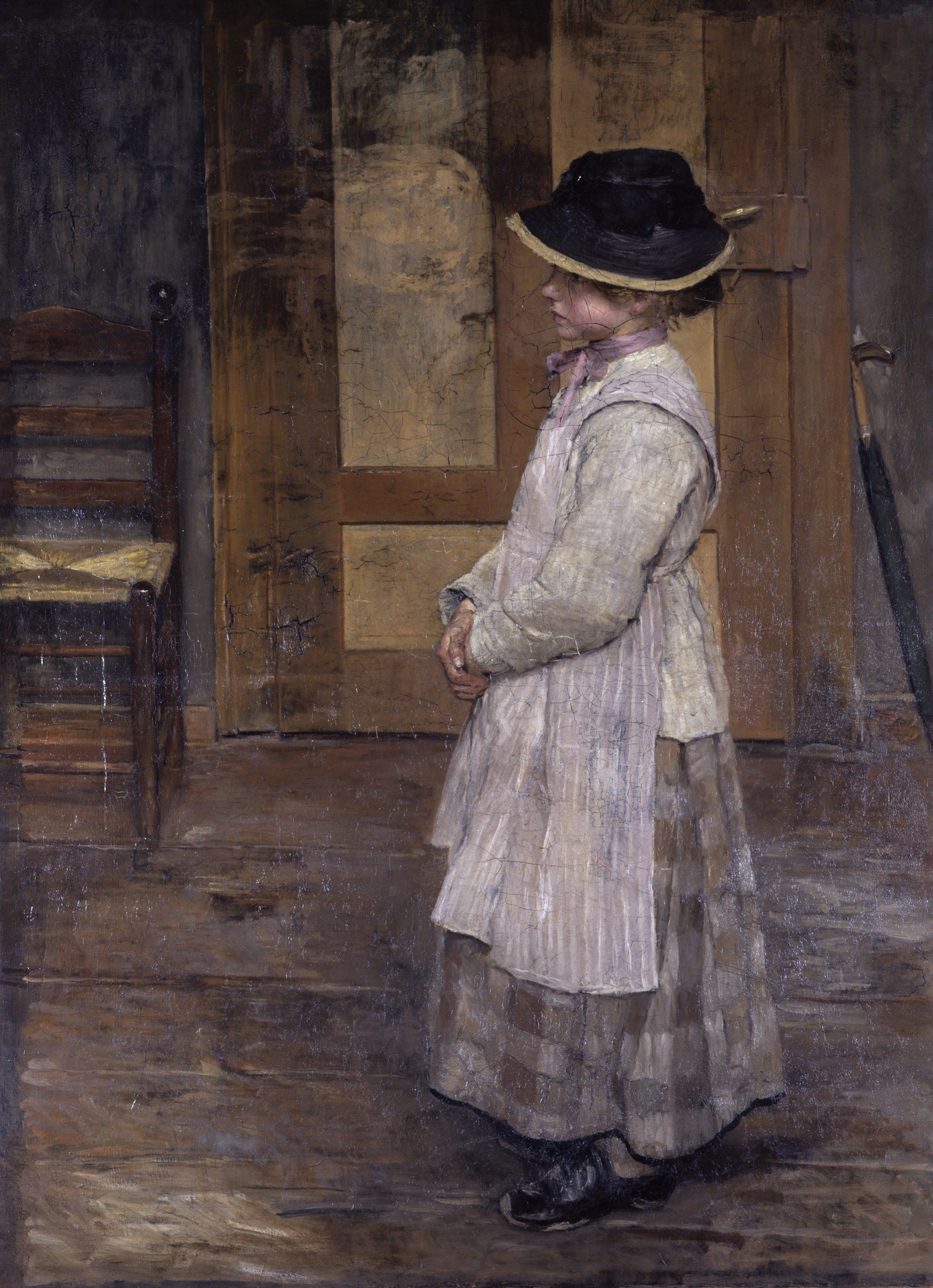
At the Door (1885)

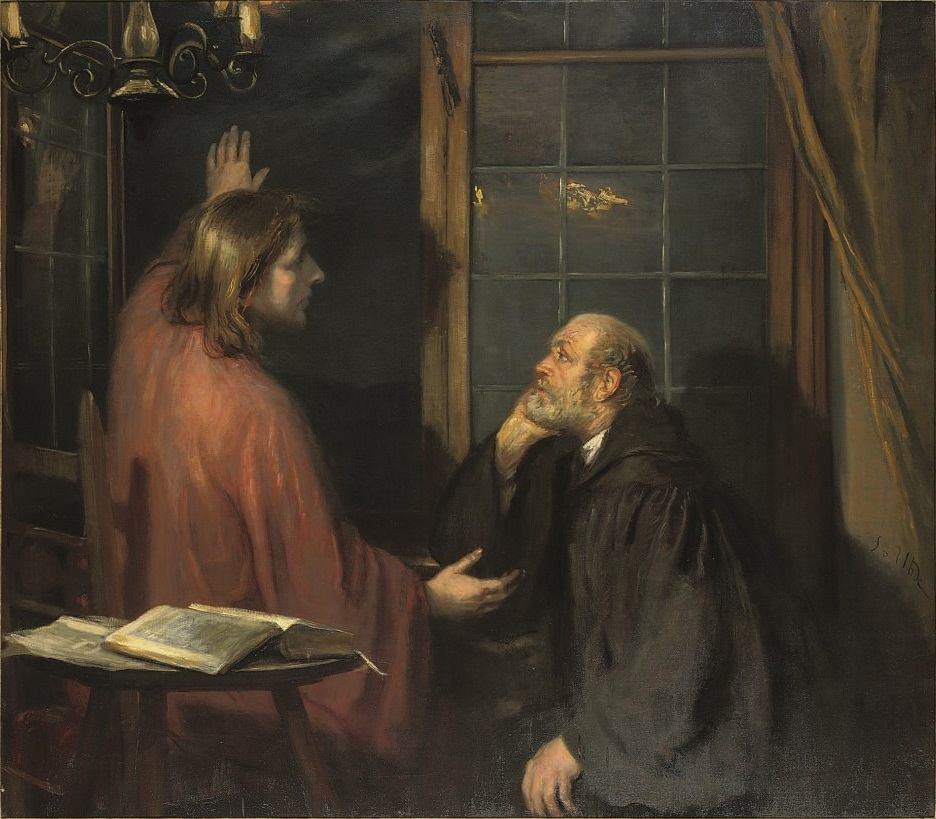
Christus and Nicodemus (1896)
Oil on wood

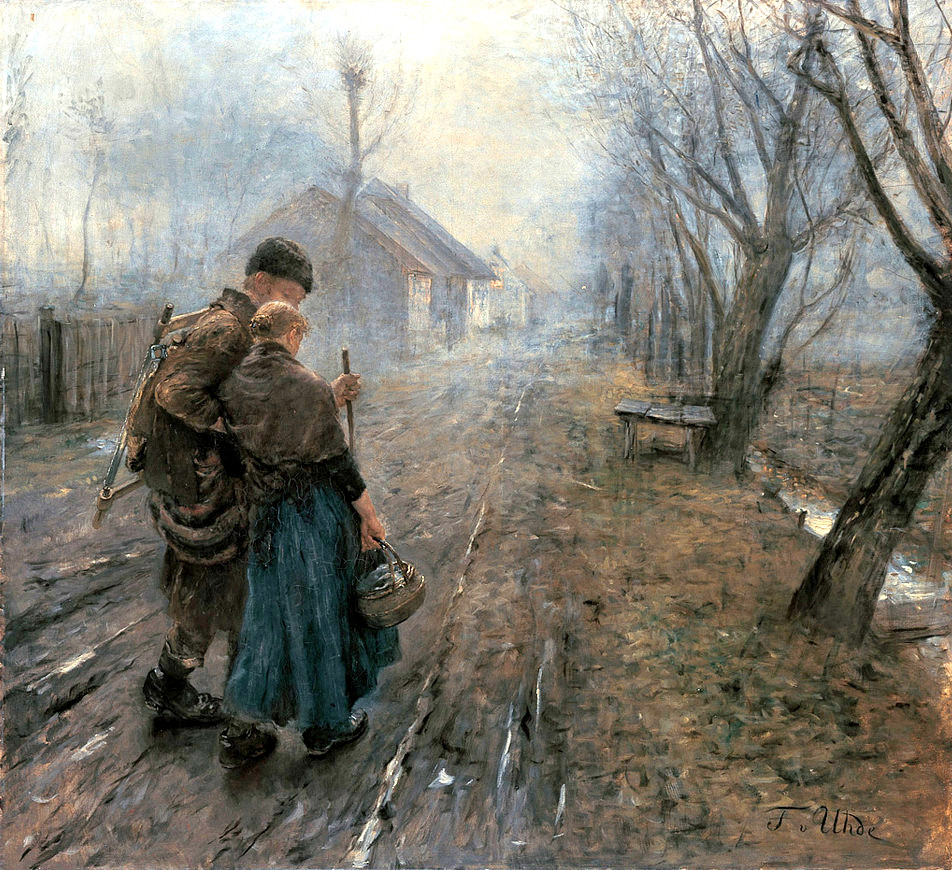
Road to Bethlehem; also known as The Difficult Journey (1890)

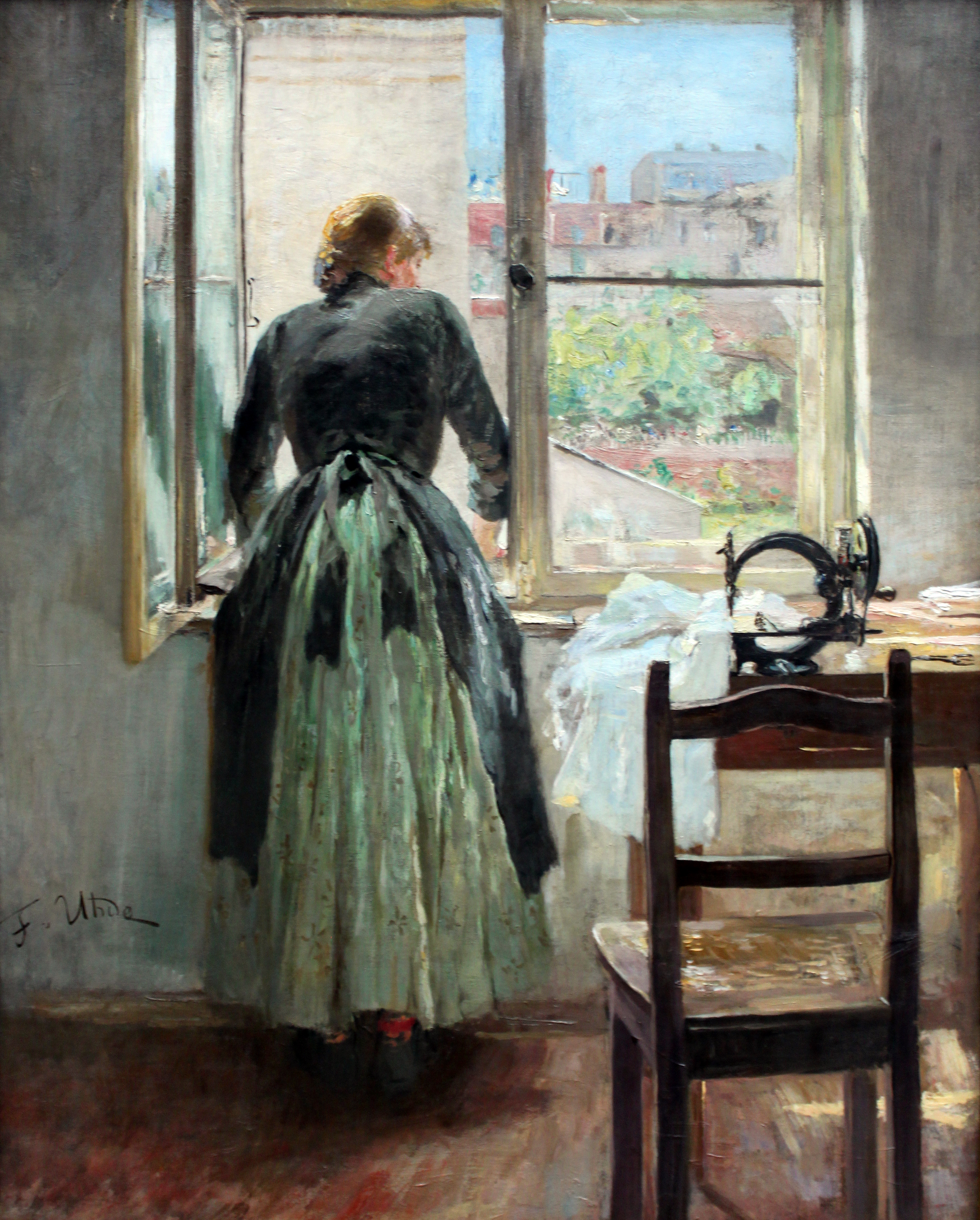
At the Window (1890)

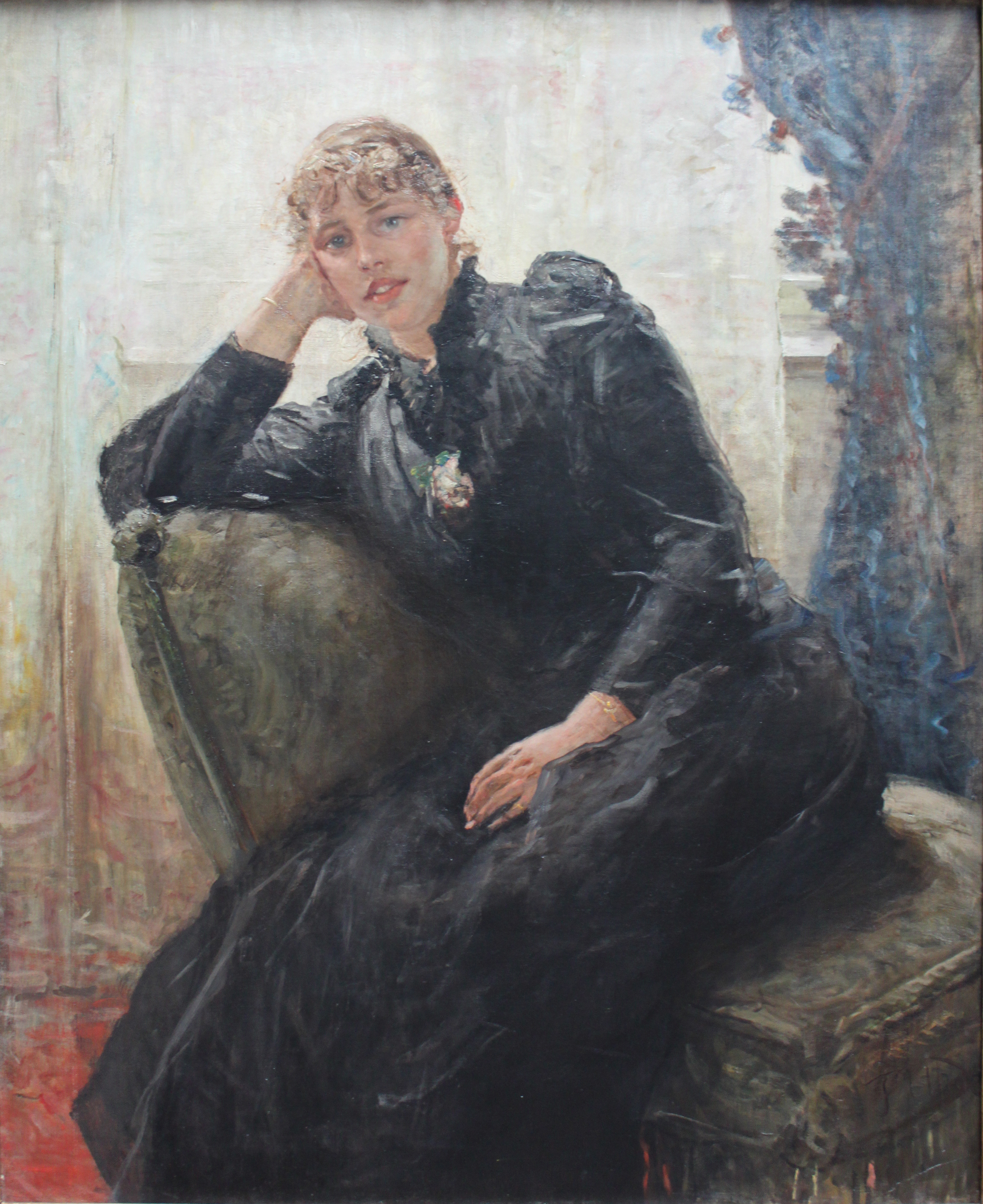
Portrait of Therese Karl (1890)

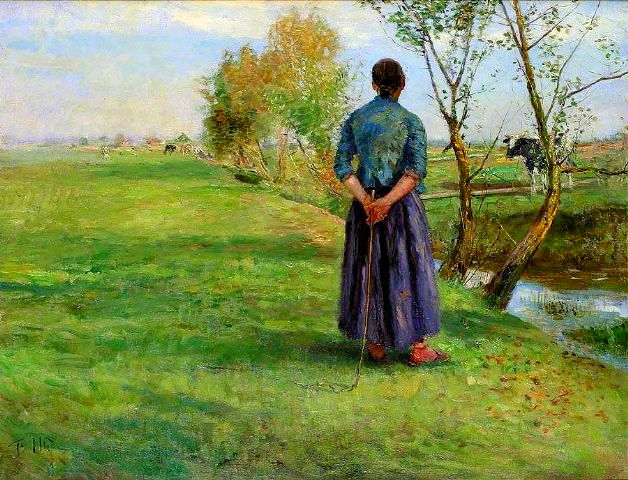
Shepherdess at the Dachau Camp (1890)

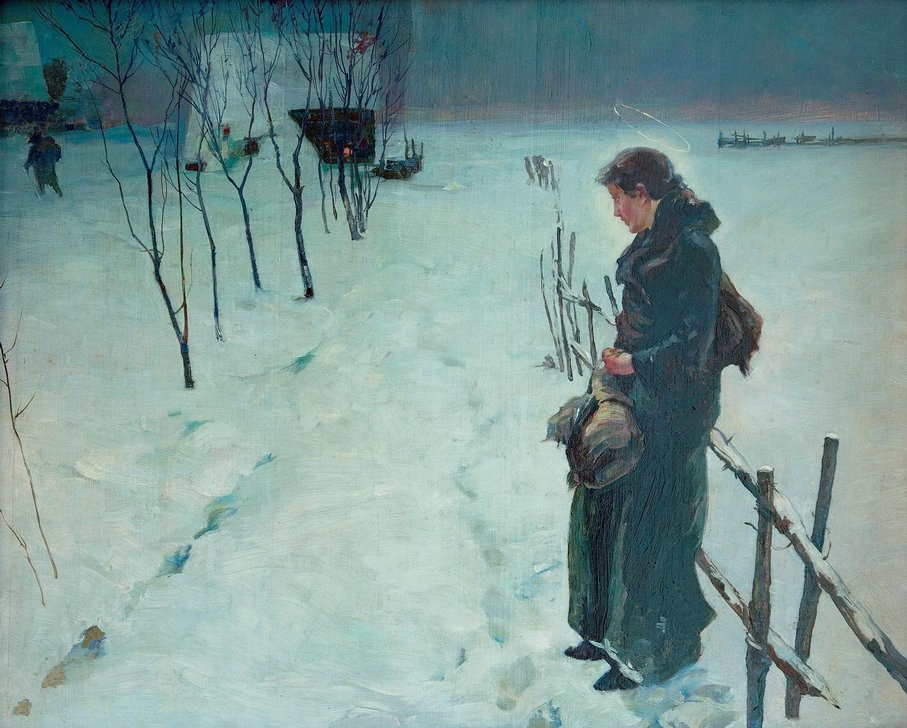
Winter Landscape (1890)

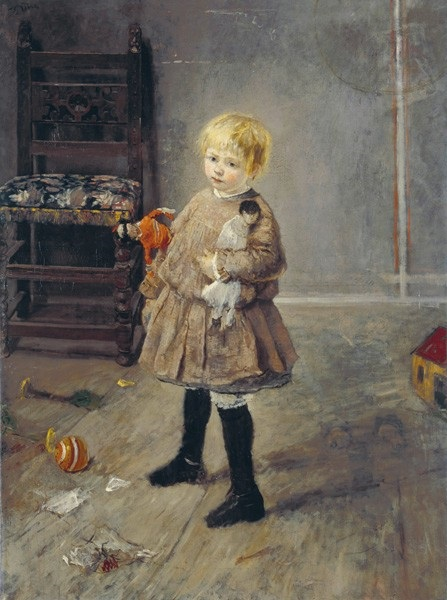
Child with a Doll (1895)

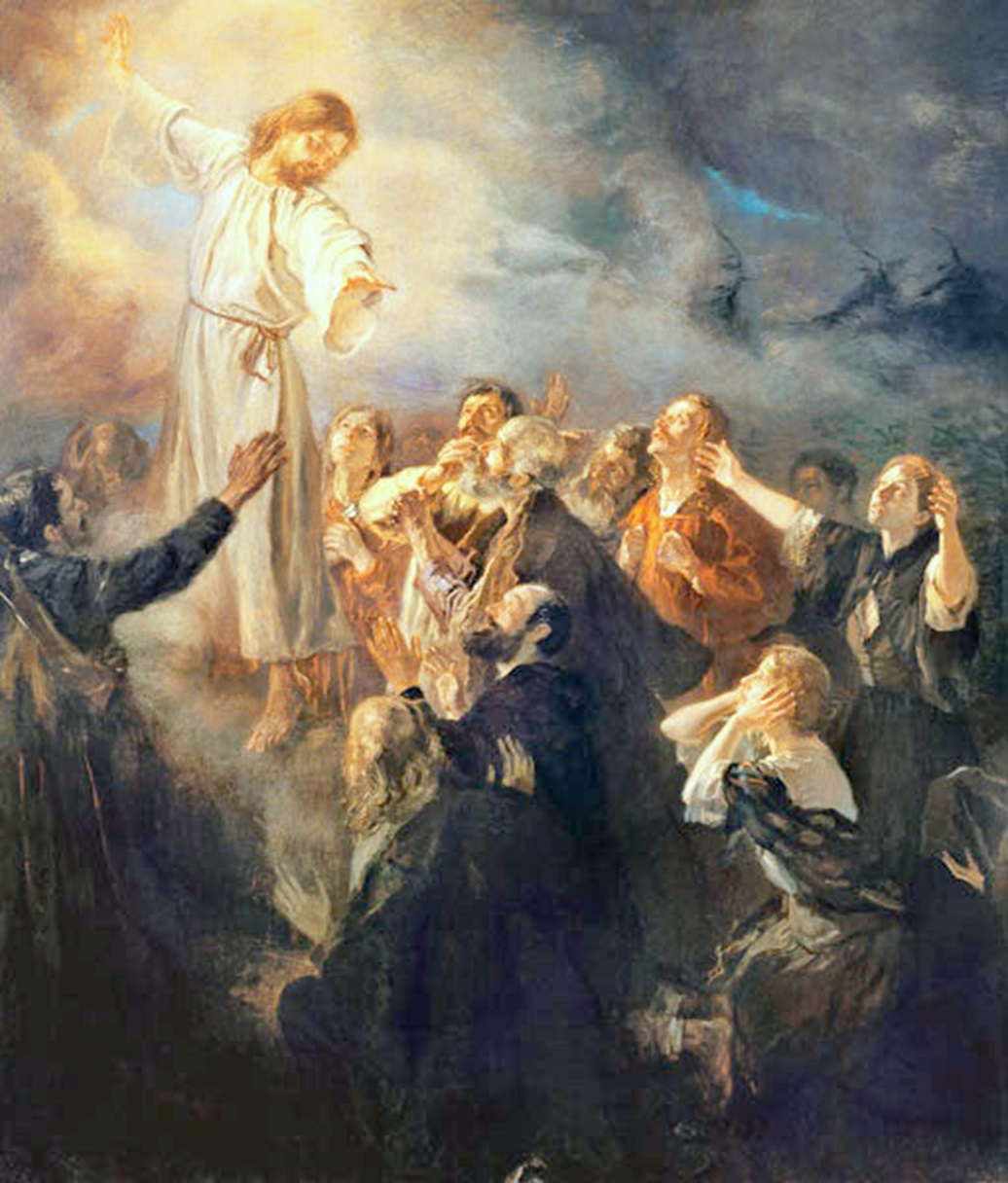
The Ascension of Christ (1897)

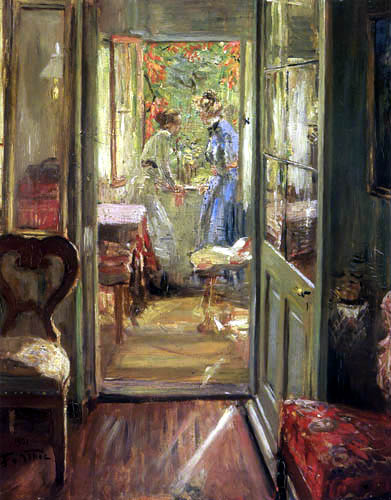
Girls on the Veranda (1901)

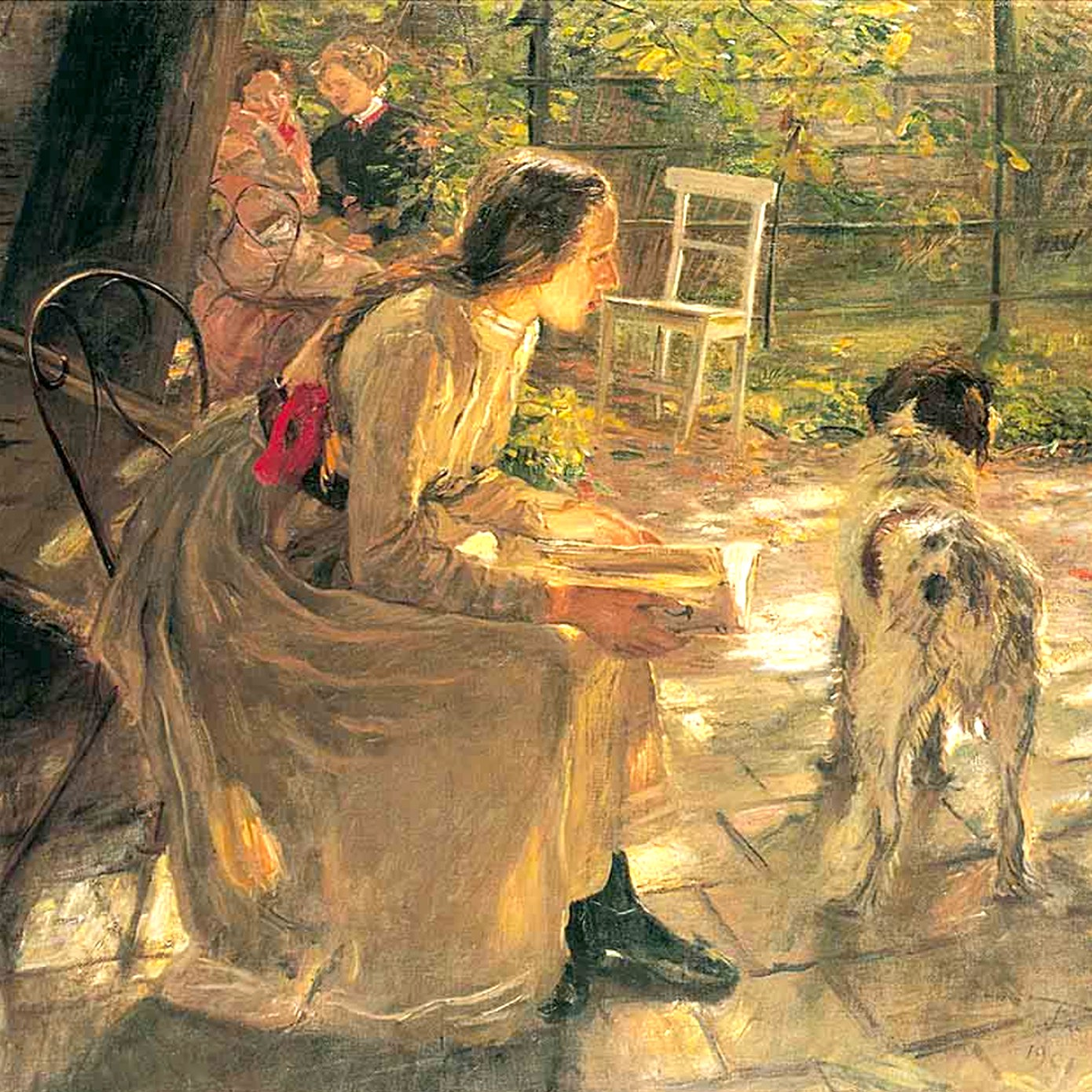
In the Garden (1901)

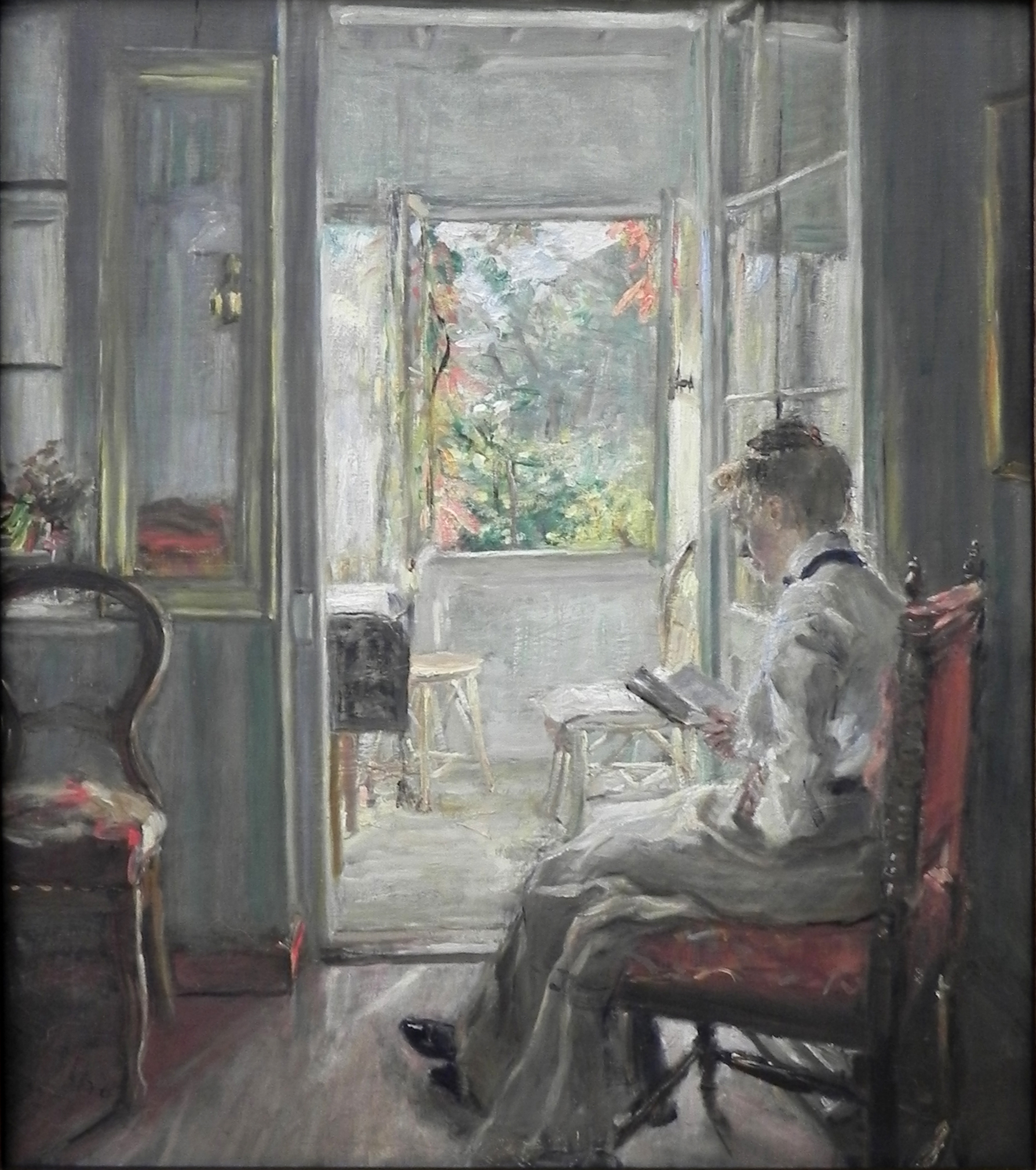
The reading girl (1902)

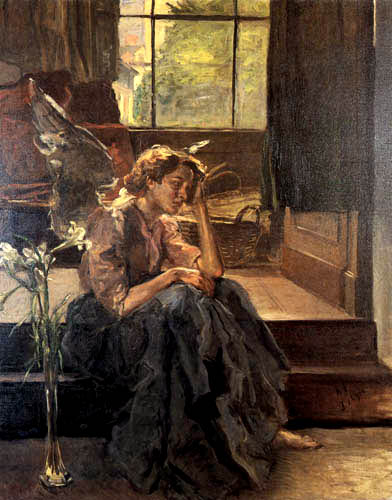
Seated Angel on the Stairs (1910)

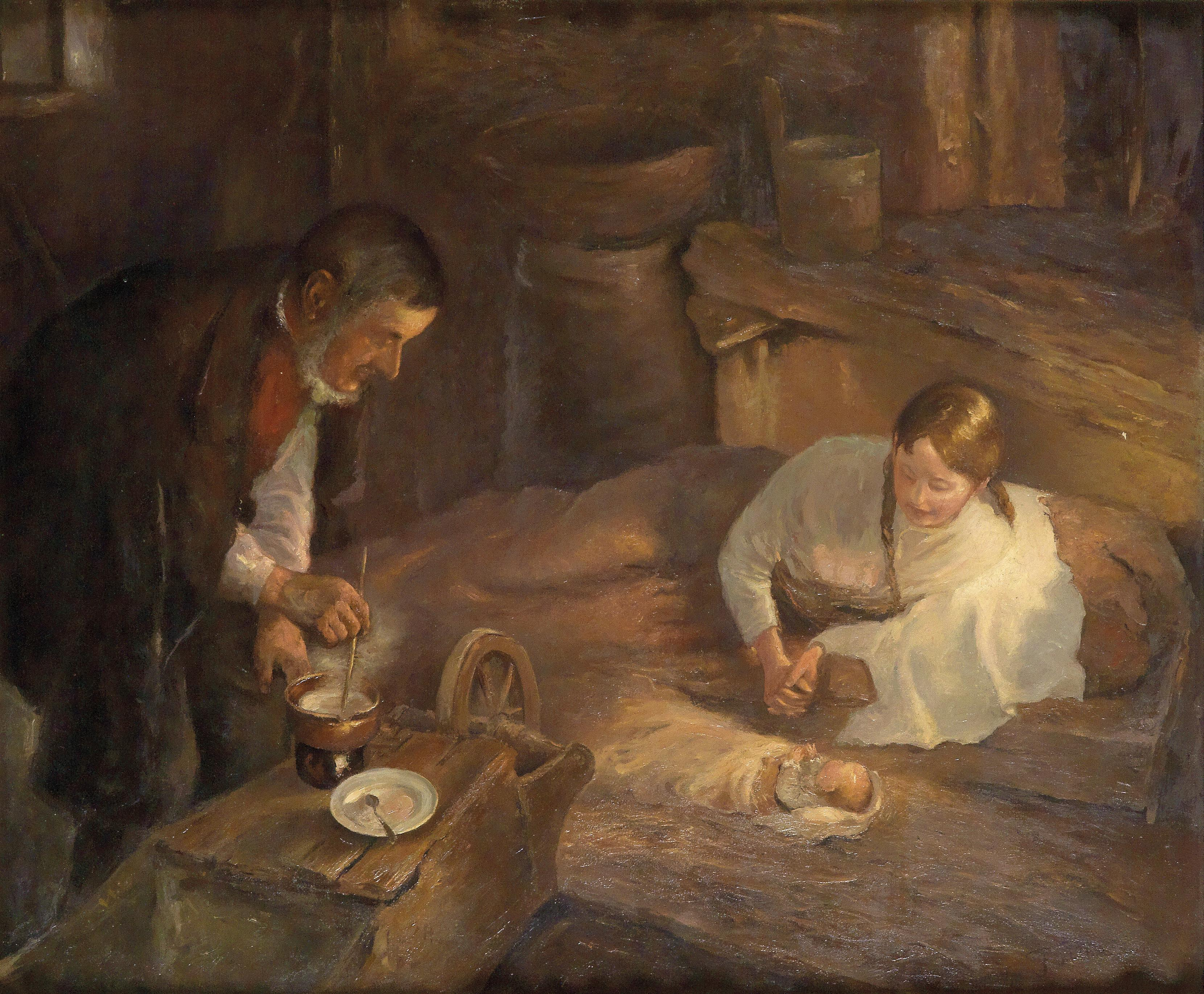
Holy Night (1911)
