= Martha Cunz =

Swiss painter (1876–1961)

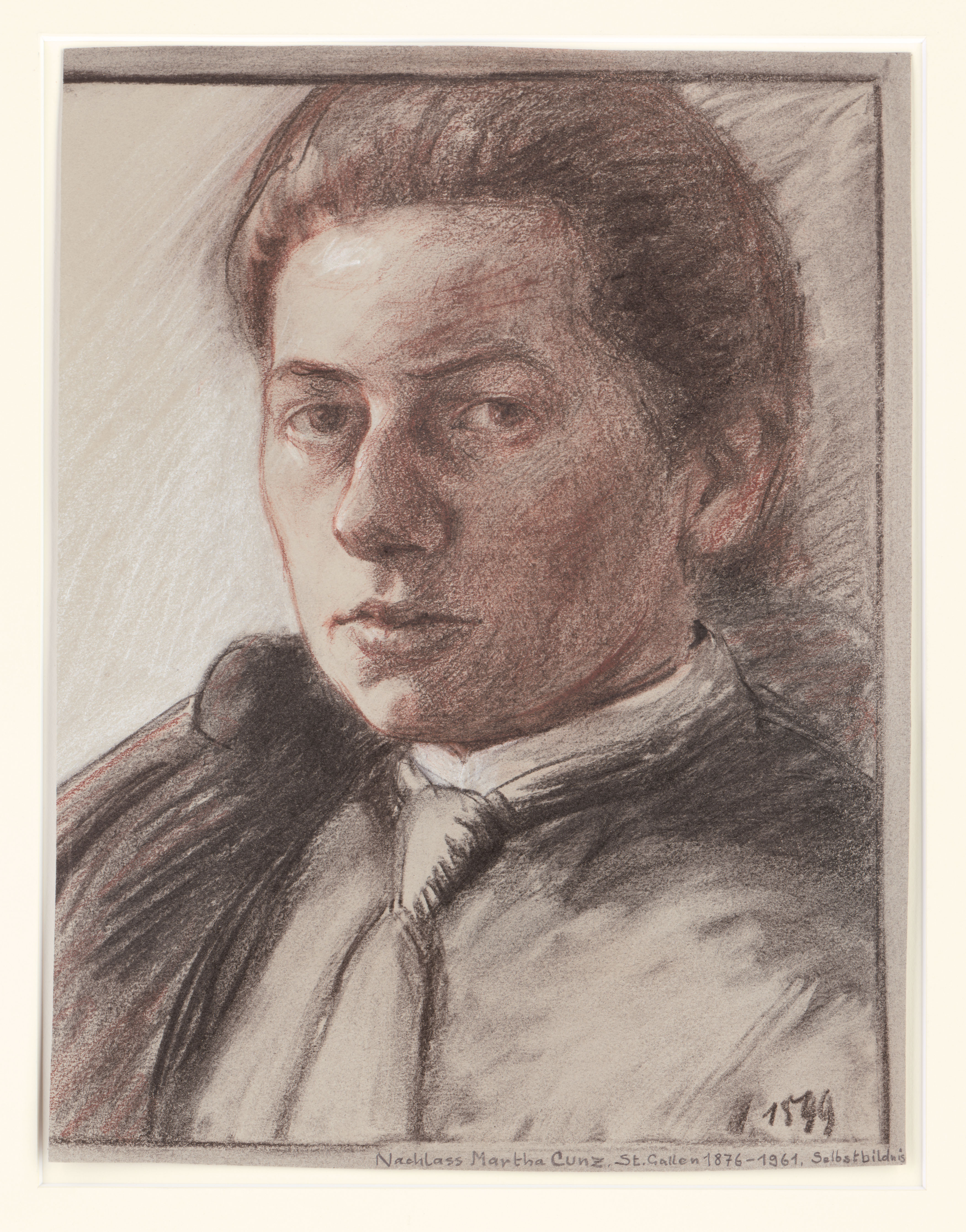
- Martha Cunz, Self-Portrait, 1899
- Born: 24 February 1876
- Died: 15 May 1961 (aged 85)
- Known for: Painting
- Style: Semi-abstract landscapes

Martha Cunz (24 February 1876 – 15 May 1961) was a Swiss artist who is best known as a printmaker. As one of the earliest 20th-century European artists to master the modernist woodcut, she was influential on other artists.

== Education and travels ==
Martha Cunz was born in St. Gallen, Switzerland. She received most of her art training at the Women's Art School in Munich, where her teachers included Christian Landenberger, Ludwig Schmid-Reutte, and Peter Paul Müller. In 1900, she went to Paris to study with Luc-Olivier Merson and Lucien Simon. The following year, back in Munich, a course in lithography with Ernst Neumann sparked her interest in printmaking. By the following year, she had moved on to woodcuts, and in 1903 she became a founding member of the German Association of Graphics.

Until the outbreak of World War I, Cunz lived in Munich and only returned to Switzerland for an annual visit. She also traveled around Europe, spending time in Holland (1904, 1911) and Italy (1914).

In 1920, she built a studio built at her parents' home in St. Gallen and lived there for the remainder of her life.

== Artwork ==
For the first three decades of her career, Cunz specialized in lithographs and woodcuts, especially color woodcuts printed using a Japanese multi-block technique. She was one of the first 20th century European artists to take up color woodblock printmaking. Her style is characterized by the play of subtly graded contrasting colors that overlap to create a luminous surface.

By 1905, Cunz was showing in the annual Glass Palace Exhibition in Munich, and some of her earliest woodcuts were published in April 1905 in the journal Deutsche Kunst und Dekoration alongside work by Wassily Kandinsky and other Munich artists.

The last of her 71 woodcuts was made in 1927, and her last lithographs were made in 1931. For the following two decades, she devoted herself to painting, mainly landscapes and portraits.

Cunz is known to have influenced the work of contemporaries like Carl Thiemann, and she also taught printmakers, including Rosa Paul.

== Sources ==
This page is translated from de:Martha Cunz. Sources listed on that page include:

- Studer, Dani. Faszination Farbholzschnitt: Der japanisierende Farbholzschnitt als Kunstform des Jugendstils: Mit einem Katalog der Holzschnitte von Martha Cunz. St. Gallen: Historisches und Völkerkundemuseum, 2016. ISBN 978-3-7291-1152-3. (Exhibition catalog; in German)
- Studer, Daniel. "Martha Cunz (1876-1961)". Dissertation, University of Zürich, 1992.
- Studer, Daniel. Martha Cunz 1876-1961: Eine Schweizer Jugendstilkünstlerin in München. St. Gallen: Verlagsgemeinschaft St. Gallen, 1993. (in German)
- Hanhart, Rudolf, ed. Kunstmuseum St. Gallen: Katalog der Sammlung. St. Gallen: Kunstmuseum St. Gallen, 1987, pp. 245–249. (in German)
- Widmer, Marina, ed. Blütenweiss bis rabenschwarz: St.Galler Frauen: 200 Portraits. Zürich: Limmat, 2003, pp. 83–84. (in German)
- Eichhorn, Herbert, and Jacqueline Koller, eds. Wege zu Gabriele Münter und Käthe Kollwitz: Holzschnitte von Künstlerinnen des Jugendstils und des Expressionismus. Petersberg: Michael Imhoff Verlag, 2014. ISBN 978-3-86568-981-8. (Exhibition catalog including short biography of Cunz; in German).
