= Carl Thiemann =

Bohemian artist

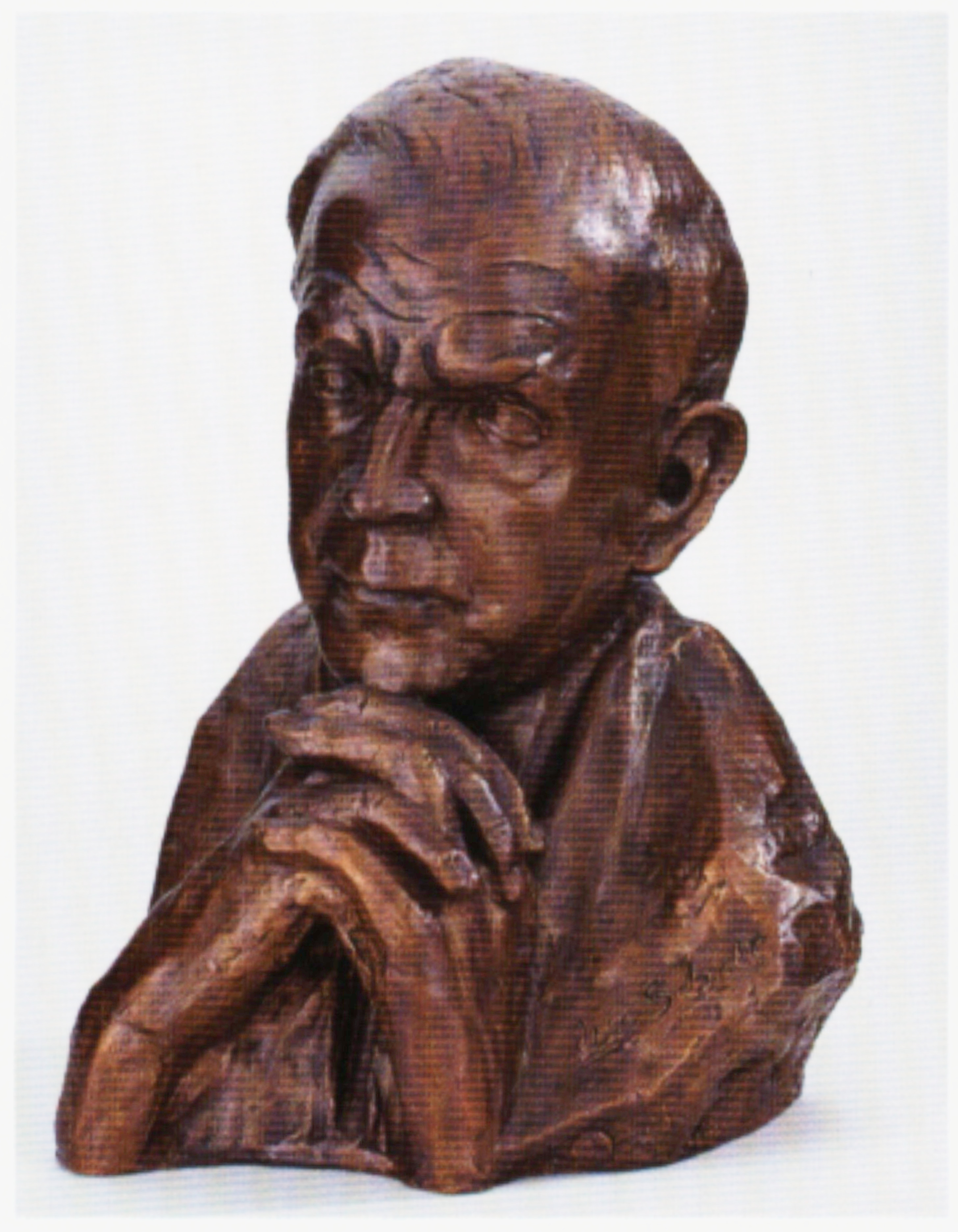
Bust of Thiemann by Ulla Scholl

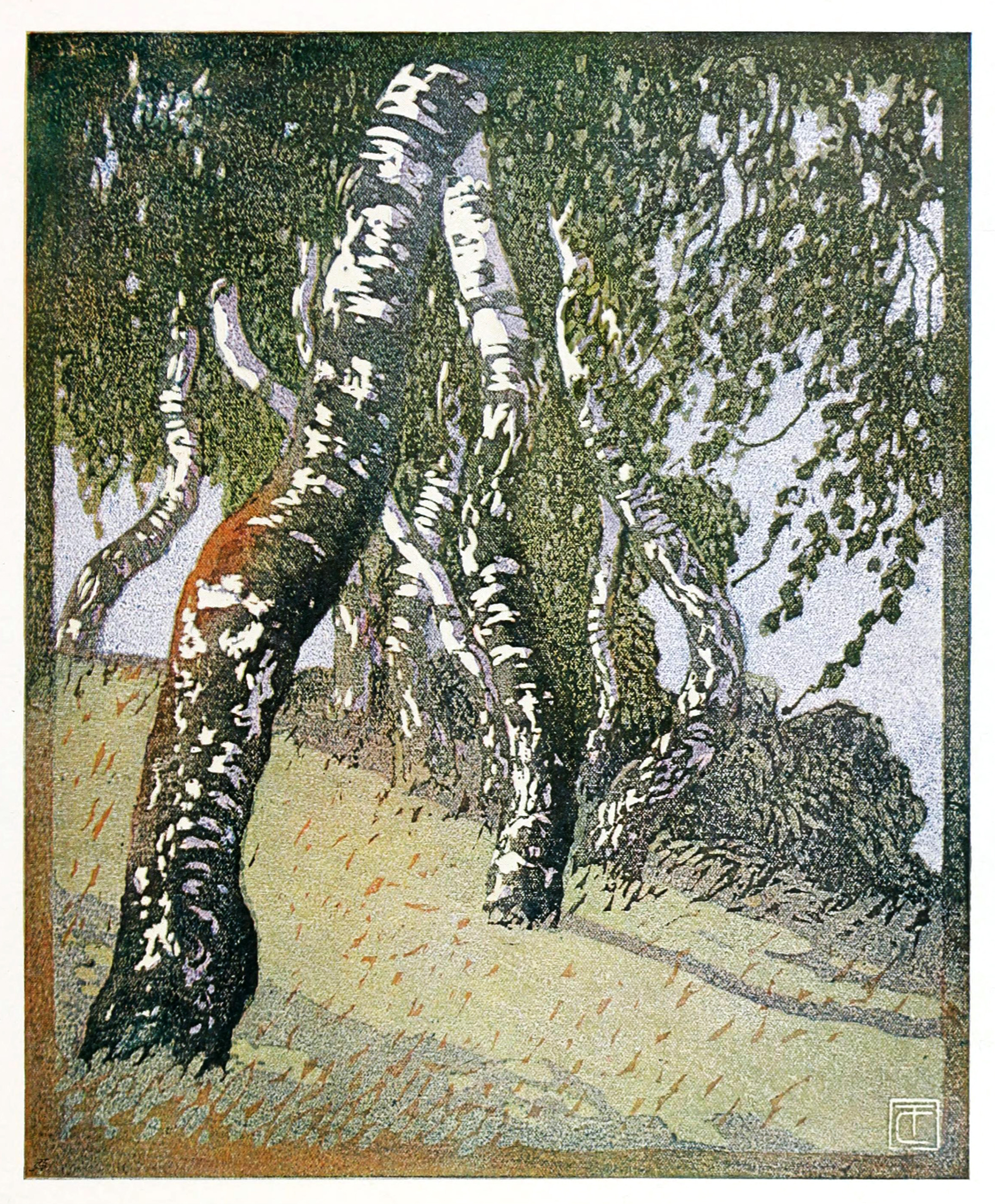
Birches by Carl Thiemann, color woodcut, 1908.

Carl Thiemann (10 November 1881 – 3 December 1966) was a Bohemian artist and member of the Vienna Secession, best known for his color woodcuts.

== Life ==
Carl Theodor Thiemann was born in Carlsbad, Bohemia, which was then part of the Austrian Empire (it is today known as Karlovy Vary and is in the Czech Republic). His father died when he was young, leaving the family in distressed circumstances; as a result, he initially went into trade rather than training as an artist. Eventually he was able to study at the Art Academy in Prague, first as a painter and later as a printmaker. He became interested in the Japanese technique of printing color woodcuts using water-based inks, which was then a new technique in Austrian art circles.

In 1904 he moved to Prague and set up a studio with the artist Walther Klemm. In 1908, he and Klemm moved to the Dachau art colony, where he became a cofounder of the Dachau Artists' Association. Shortly thereafter, he married Louise Miéville, a Swiss language teacher. Their daughter Margarete also became a painter.

Around 1910 he became a member of the Vienna Secession and the Deutscher Künstlerbund.

He was widowed in 1957 and two years later he married a cousin, Ottilie Rady Thiemann-Stoedtner.

== Art ==
Thiemann left an extensive oeuvre ranging from painting to all forms of printmaking. He is best known for his color woodblock prints of landscapes featuring trees (especially birch trees) and city streets, all rendered in a strongly graphic style with subtle coloration. His work was influenced by Martha Cunz's woodcuts, and it has stylistic affinities with such artists as Ferdinand Mirwald and Frances Gearhart.

He won a number of awards, including the Federal Cross of Merit and the Golden Ring of Honor of the City of Dachau (1966). A street in Dachau is named after him.

== Sources ==
This page is translated from de:Carl Thiemann. Sources listed on that page include:

- Thiemann, Carl. Erinnerungen eines Dachauer Malers. Dachau, n.d.
- Merx, Klaus. Carl Thiemann 1881-1966. Meister des Farbholzschnitts. Darmstadt, 1976.
- Thiemann-Stoedtner, Ottilie. Carl Thiemann: Der Mensch - der Künstler. Dachau, 1978.
- Thiemann-Stoedtner, Ottilie. Dachauer Maler: Der Künstlerort Dachau von 1801 bis 1946. Dachau, 1981.
- Göttler, Norbert. Sie machten Geschichte im Dachauer Land. Dachau, 1989.
- Reitmeier, Lorenz Josef. Dachau: Der berühmte Malerort. Dachau, n.d.
- Klemm, Walther, and Carl Thiemann. Zwei Meister des Farbholzschnitts. Dachau, 2016. ISBN 978-3-930941-85-8.
