= Walther Klemm =

German painter

Olympic medal record

Art competitions
Bronze medal – third place	1928 Amsterdam	Painting

Walther Klemm (June 18, 1883 – August 11, 1957) was a German painter, printmaker, and illustrator.

He was born in Karlsbad and studied at the University of Applied Arts Vienna and the University of Vienna. In 1904 he exhibited with the Vienna Secession and moved to Prague and established a studio with Carl Thiemann. Klemm and Thiemann moved to the Dachau art colony in 1908 and both joined the Berlin Secession and Deutscher Künstlerbund around 1910.

Klemm was appointed professor of graphics at the Weimar Saxon Grand Ducal Art School in 1913 and after the Second World War aided in the reconstruction of the Weimar Art School. In 1952 he was named an honorary senator of the Weimar School of Architecture and Civil and Structural Engineering (now absorbed by the Bauhaus University, Weimar). He died in 1957 in Weimar.

In 1928 he won a bronze medal in the art competitions of the Olympic Games for his "Schlittschuhlaufen" ("Skating"). In 1953 he received the Nordgau-Kulturpreis for visual art.
