= Arthur Langhammer =

German painter

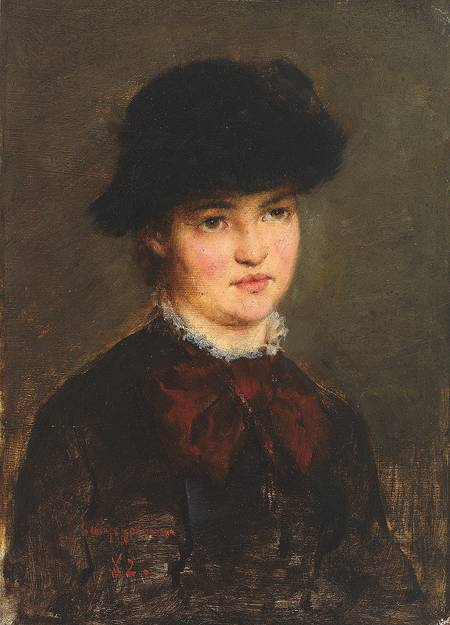
Arthur Langhammer, Portrait of a Young Woman, 1882

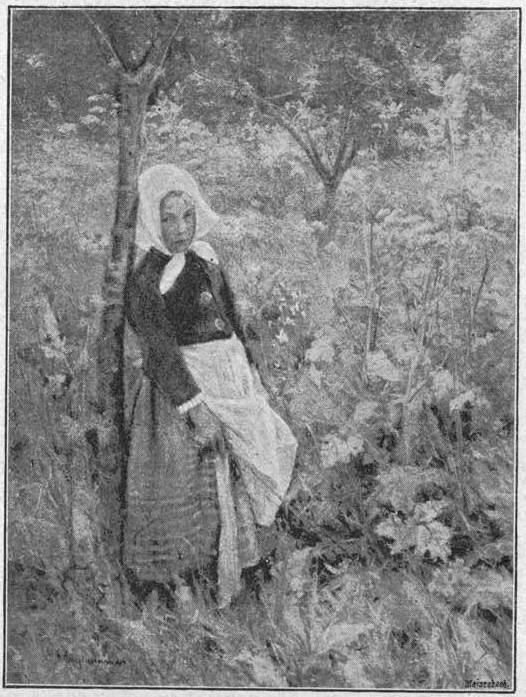
Arthur Langhammer, Spring, ca. 1891

Arthur Langhammer (July 6, 1854 – July 4, 1901) was a German Impressionist painter and illustrator best known for rural genre paintings.

== Biography ==
Arthur Langhammer was born in Lützen, Germany. He studied art first at the Leipzig Art Academy and then at the Munich Art Academy, graduating in 1882. He initially earned his living as an illustrator.

In 1888 his friend Adolf Hölzel moved to the village of Dachau, Germany, and Langhammer began spending time there as well. In 1897, Hölzel, Langhammer and Ludwig Dill founded the "New Dachau" art school, which became the keystone of the burgeoning Dachau art colony. In 1898, the new colony achieved national recognition when Hölzel, Dill, and Langhammer mounted a joint exhibition in Berlin under the title "The Dachauer". Langhammer moved to Dachau permanently in 1900.

Langhammer specialized in idealized rural genre paintings of people working in the fields or at home. He painted in an Impressionist style with vigorous brushwork and a rich color palette. He showed with the Munich Secession, and his work is now held by museums and galleries in Dachau, Lützen and elsewhere.

He died in Dachau.

== Sources ==
This page is in part translated from de:Arthur Langhammer. Sources on that page include:

- Diem, Eugen. "Langhammer, Artur". In Neue Deutsche Biographie, vol. 13. Berlin: Duncker & Humblot, 1982, p. 599. ISBN 3-428-00194-X. (in German)
- Roeßler, Artur. "Arthur Langhammer, ein Dachauer Meistermaler". In Wiener Zeitung supplement to the Wiener Abendpost, Feb. 9, 1905, p. 8ff. (in German)
