= Adolf Hölzel =

German painter (1853–1934)

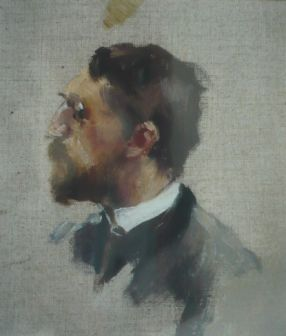
Self-portrait (c.1887)

Adolf Richard Hölzel (13 May 1853 – 17 October 1934) was a German painter. He began as a Realist, but later became an early promoter of various Modern styles, including Abstractionism.

== Biography ==
Hölzel was born in Olmütz. His father was the publisher, Eduard Hölzel. In 1868, he completed a three-year apprenticeship as a typesetter at the map publishing firm of F.A.Perthes in Gotha. Three years later, he and his family moved to Vienna where the following year he enrolled at the Academy of Fine Arts, moving to the Academy of Fine Arts, Munich, in 1876, where he studied with Wilhelm von Diez.

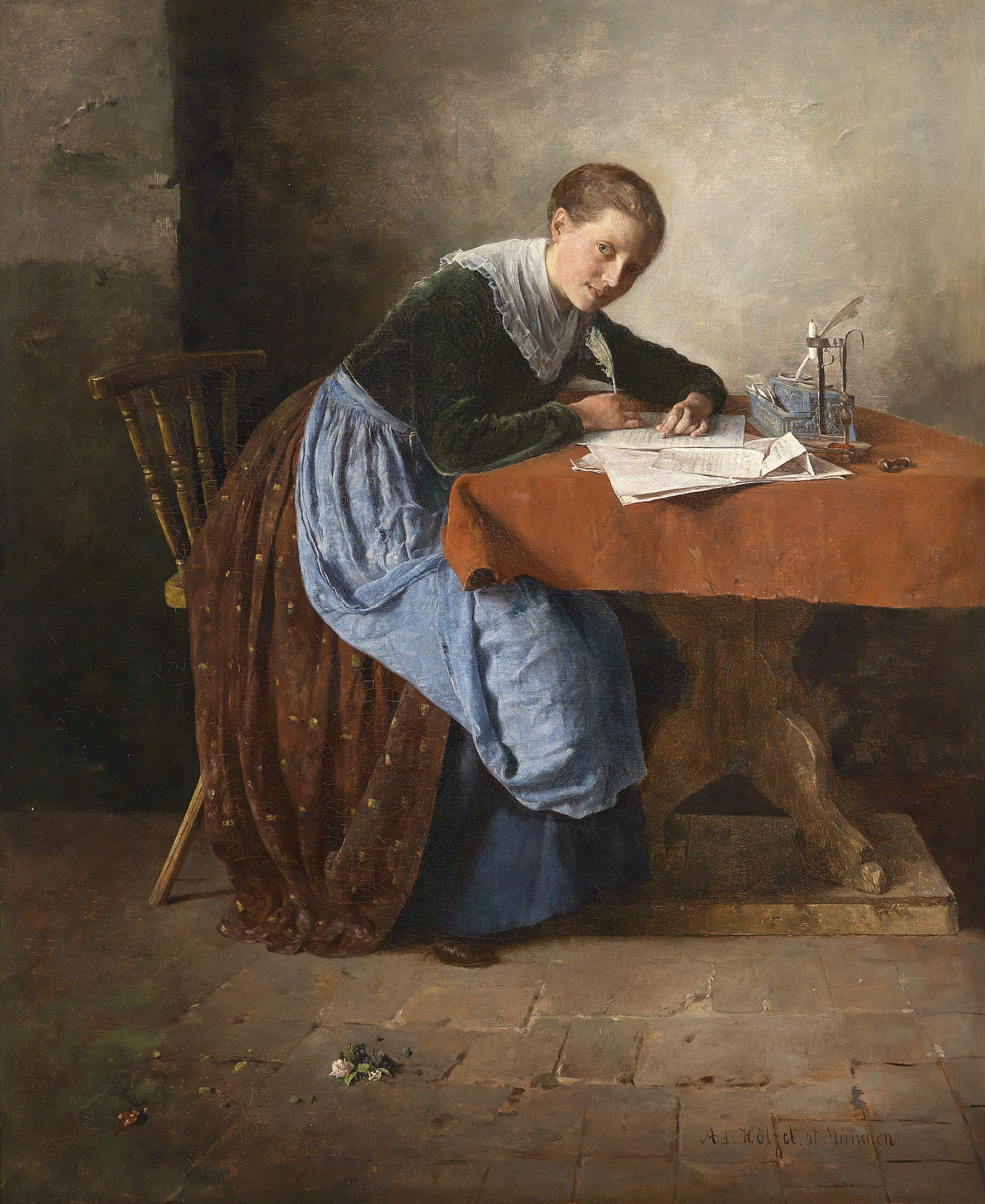
The Love Letter; an example of his early work

After completing his studies, Hölzel married and divided his time between Munich and Rothenburg ob der Tauber. In Munich, he became acquainted with Fritz von Uhde, who introduced him to Impressionism. Together with Von Uhde, Ludwig Dill and Arthur Langhammer, he helped create an art school, the Dachauer Malschule, in the nearby village of Dachau, which later became the keystone of the famous Dachau art colony. He lived there from 1888 to 1905 and his novel teaching methods drew students from all over Europe. In 1904, he participated in the first exhibition of the Deutscher Künstlerbund.

During his time in Dachau, Hölzel's work began moving toward abstraction, reflecting his interest in such principles as the golden section and Goethe's Theory of Colors. After studying the color theories of Wilhelm von Bezold, he developed his own color theory, based on a circle with "diatonic" and "chromatic" values (terms taken from music). He was involved in creating the Munich Secession and the Vienna Secession. His influential essay "Über Formen und Massenvertheilung" (On Shapes and Mass Distribution), was published in Ver Sacrum. After leaving Dachau, he still returned in the summer months to give private lessons.

In 1905, Hölzel was appointed to replace Leopold von Kalckreuth at the State Academy of Fine Arts in Stuttgart and received commissions on religious themes from the Deutscher Werkbund. Despite abandoning Realism, he still felt that his paintings contained a strong element of religion. Among his students the so-called "Hölzel circle" developed, including Oskar Schlemmer, Willi Baumeister, Max Ackermann, Alf Bayrle and Johannes Itten. He constantly promoted exhibitions of Expressionist art and established a special painting school for women.

Tired of the continuous opposition from his colleagues, Hölzel retired in 1919, but continued to give private lessons and work as a freelance painter. He died in obscurity in 1934, in Stuttgart. His personal papers have been preserved at the Staatsgalerie Stuttgart. In 2005, the non-profit "Adolf Hölzel-Stiftung" was created to preserve and promote his works.

== Selected paintings ==
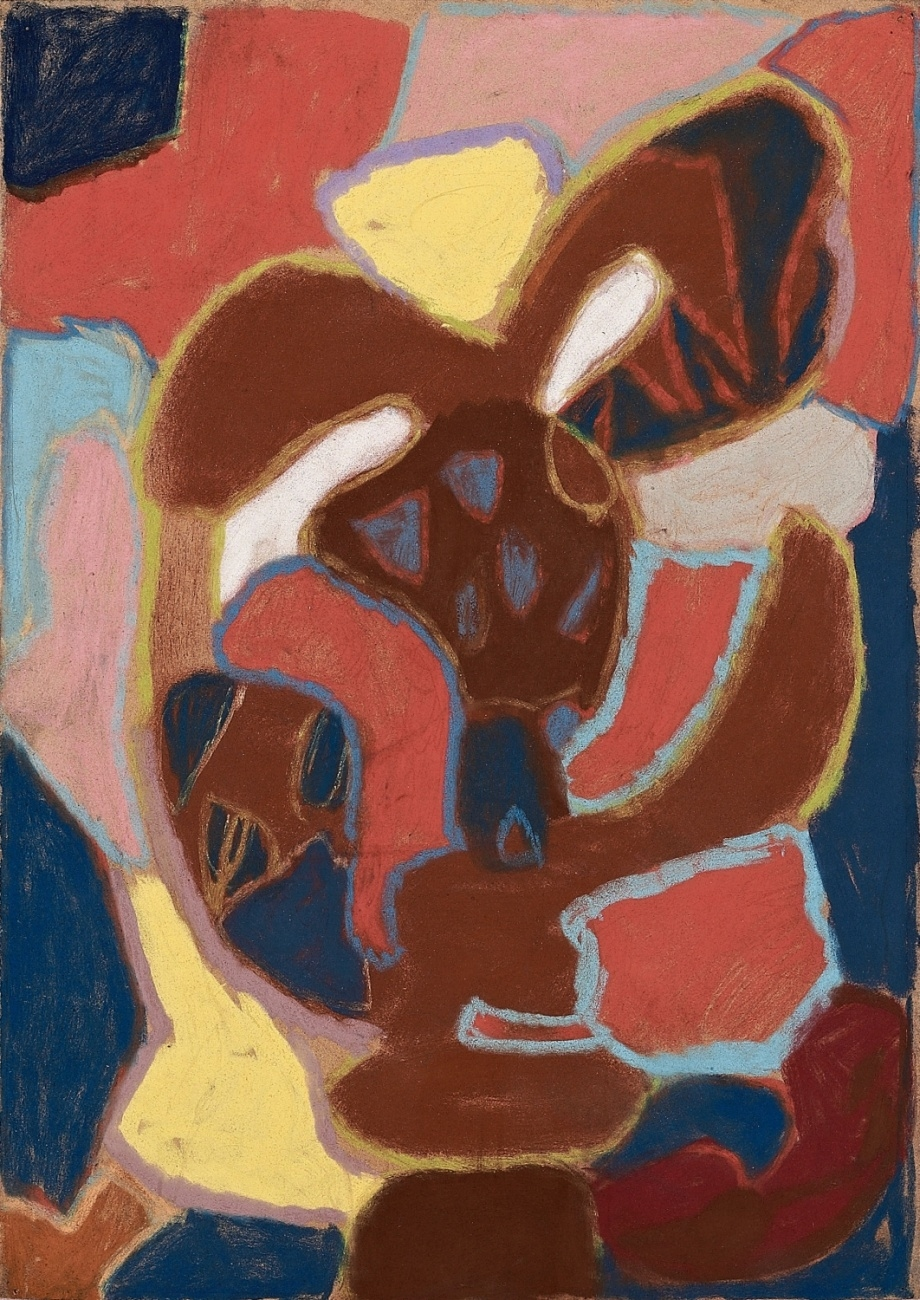
Composition

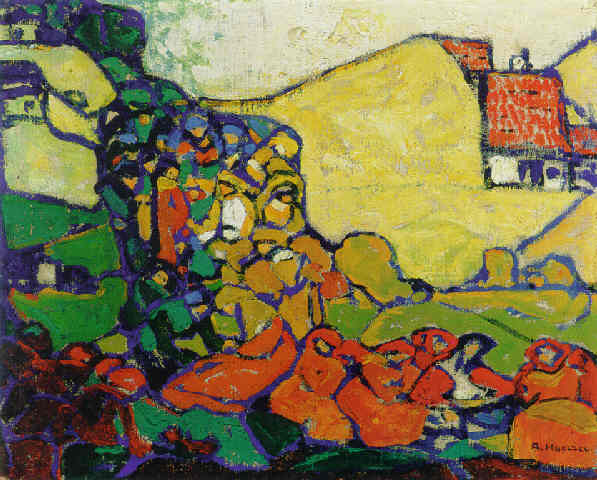
Journey

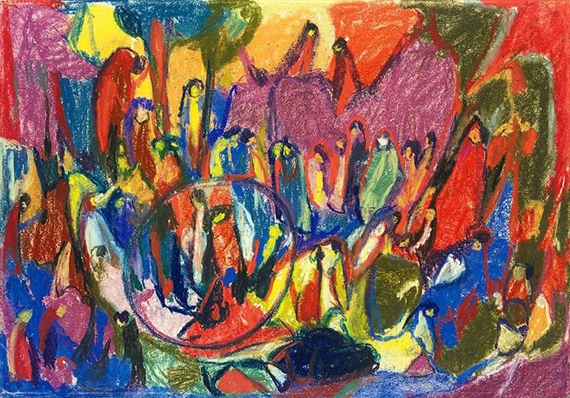
Figures in a Landscape

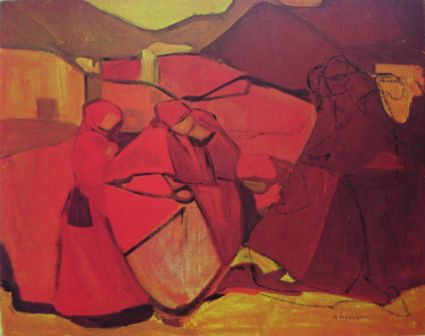
Composition in Red

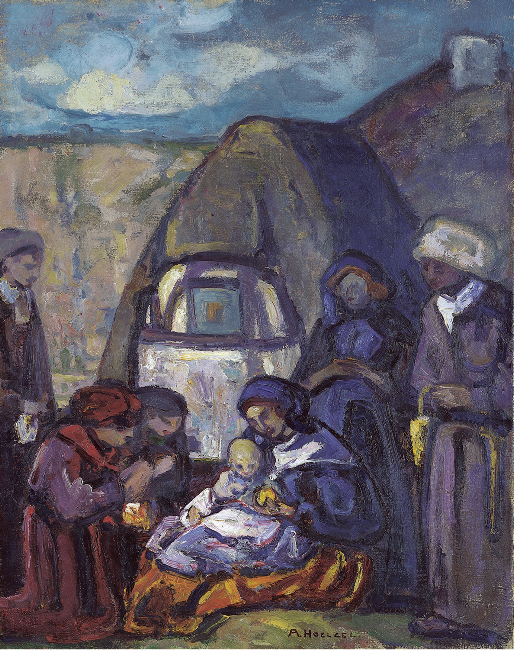
Adoration

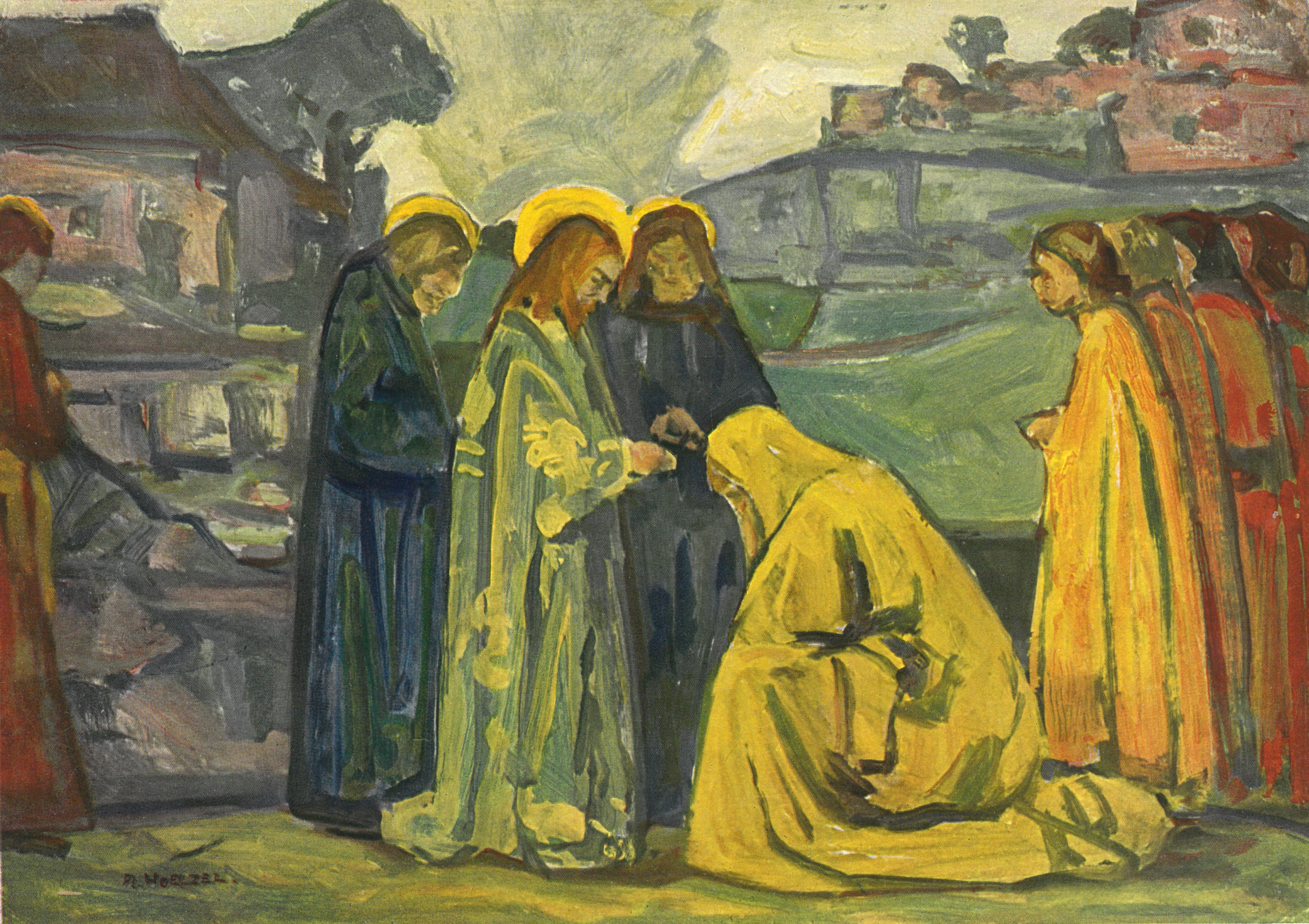
Christ and the woman of Canaan
