= Ludwig Dill =

German painter

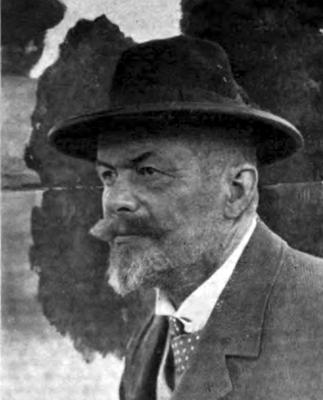
Ludwig Dill (c.1904)

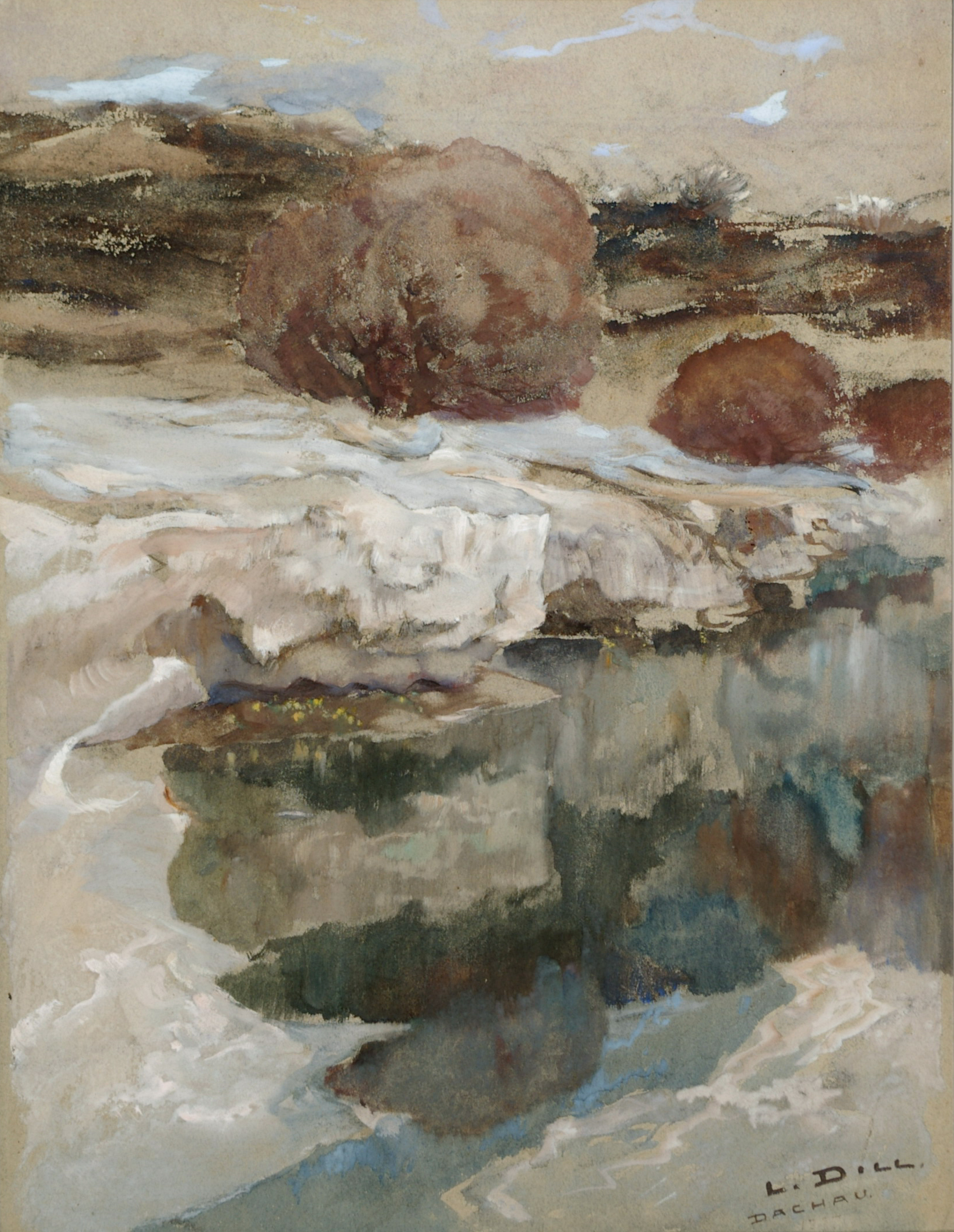
The Last Snowdrifts (1897), watercolor and gouache on paper

Wilhelm Franz Karl Ludwig Dill (2 February 1848 – 24 October 1940) was a German ship and landscape painter who was a founding member of the Munich Secession.

== Life and work ==
Born in Gernsbach, he was the only son of the Tax Assessor (later a Magistrate) for the Grand Duchy of Baden. The family moved several times, finally settling in Stuttgart in 1862.

Beginning in 1872, he studied architecture at the Polytechnic Institute (now the University of Stuttgart), then moved to the Academy of Fine Arts, Munich, in 1874, where he studied under Karl Theodor von Piloty and Otto Seitz. He was, however, more influenced by the landscapes of Adolf Heinrich Lier and decided to pursue that speciality himself.

He did a great deal of travelling and the area around Venice (especially Chioggia) became one of his favorites for plein air painting. The impressionistic nature of the land and seascapes eventually led him to a sort of ornamental stylization, approaching Art Nouveau. He later became a founding member of the Munich Secession and served as its President from 1894 to 1899.

Of particular importance to his career was his friendship with Adolf Hölzel, who ran an art school in Dachau, the site of an artists' colony. The area, with its many moors and watercourses, was instantly attractive to Dill. In 1896, he bought a small house there on a street which has since been named after him. Together with Hölzel and Arthur Langhammer, he founded a group called "New Dachau".

In 1899, he accepted a teaching position at the Academy of Fine Arts, Karlsruhe, and remained there until 1919, spending his summers in Dachau. He also served on one of the committees that selected artists to provide designs for the Stollwerck chocolate company of Cologne. His first wife died in 1905. Four years later, he married the painter Johanna Malburg, who had recently been widowed. In 1936, he became an Honorary citizen of Dachau. He died in 1940 in Karlsruhe.
