= Magda Hagstotz =

German artist

- Born: 1914; Stuttgart, Germany
- Died: 2001 (aged 86–87); Stuttgart, Germany
- Known for: Painting
- Movement: Abstract Art

Magda Hagstotz (1914–2001) was a German painter and belonging to the post-war abstract art movement. Her works consist mainly of watercolors and elaborately textured surfaces on small and medium canvases.

== Early life and education ==
Hagstotz was born in Stuttgart and was influenced by the theories of the Stuttgarter Schule and by contemporary artists such as Ida Kerkovius, Max Ackermann, Willi Baumeister, Oskar Schlemmer, Adolf Hölzel and de:Alfred Lörcher. She attended the Würtembergischen Staatlichen Kunstgewerbeschule from 1930 to 1933 and the Reimannschule Berlin in 1932. She studied in London and elsewhere from 1934 to 1937, then at the Kunstakademie Stuttgart from 1938 to 1943. She studied the nude form and composition under G. Biese from 1943 to 1945.

== Career ==
From 1941 until 1962, she was chief designer of textiles for a colored-leather manufacturer, Pfennig u. Co.; Ludwigsburg. She also engaged in independent artistic activity from 1941 onwards.

She was awarded a gold medal at the Milano Triennial.

== Works ==
A private collector in Bruges, Belgium, maintains an inventory of 27 Hagstotz works. These works span the 1950s to 1980s, and consist primarily of mixed media:

- Hinein, 1970s, unsigned (ref. 298a)
- Nachteule, 1970s, unsigned (ref. 298b)
- Grenze, 1970s, unsigned (ref. 298c)
- Zeuge, 1970s, unsigned (ref. 298d)
- Die Wiese, 1970s, unsigned (ref. 298e)
- Nachtgespinst, 1977, signed, dated (ref. 298f)
- Versprechung, 1980s, signed (ref. 298g)
- Engel der Nacht, 1967, signed (ref. 298h)
- Pax Romana, 1960s, signed (ref. 298i)
- Zwiespalt, 1960s, signed (ref. 298j)
- Schaltung, 1970s, signed (ref. 298k)
- Spur, 1990, signed (ref. 298l)
- Bezauberung, 1960s, signed, stamped (ref. 298m)
- Spiegelung, 1960s, unsigned, stamped (ref. 298n)
- Spiel, 1950s, unsigned, stamped (ref. 298o)
- Erlösung, date unknown, signed (ref. 298p)
- Zeug, date unknown, unsigned (ref. 298q)
- Strömung, date unknown, unsigned (ref. 298r)
- Sehnsucht, 1977, signed, dated (Reference 298s)
- Die Vereinbarung, date unknown, unsigned (ref. 298t)
- Dissonanz, date unknown, signed (ref. 298u)
- Ritus, date unknown, unsigned, stamped (ref. 298v)
- Florae 1, date unknown, unsigned, stamped (ref. 298x)
- Florae 2, date unknown, signed, stamped (ref. 298y)
- Florae 3, 1966, signed, dated (ref. 298z)
- Florae 4, 1965, signed, dated (ref. 298za)
- Selbstporträt mit gewalzte Tusche 1972, signed, dated (ref. 298zb)

== Bibliography ==
- Schlegel, Hans K and Paul Sviridoff. Die Malerin Magda Hagstotz, Verlag Paul Sviridoff, Schwäbisch Hall, 1984 ISBN 3-921279-06-2
- Bütow, Kurt (1995). Europäisches Künstlerlexikon: Malerei und Zeichenkunst. Königsbrunn: Bavaria Kunstverlag. ISBN 3931236005.
- Nagel, Gert K. (1986). Schwäbisches Künstlerlexikon: vom Barock bis zur Gegenwart. München: Kunst und Antiquitäten. ISBN 3921811368.
- Land auf, Land ab: Karlsruhe und Stuttgart im Kaleidoskop der Sammlung Würth; [Katalog zur Ausstellung "Land Auf, Land Ab - Karlsruhe und Stuttgart im Kaleidoskop der Sammlung Würth", Kunsthalle Würth, Schwäbisch Hall, 14. März - 3. Oktober 2004]. Künzelsau: Swiridoff. 2004. p. 105. ISBN 3899290186.
