= Sandberger =

Sandberger is a surname. Notable people with the surname include:

- Adolf Sandberger (1864–1943), German musicologist and composer
- Guido Sandberger (1821–1879), German paleontologist and geologist
- Karl Ludwig Fridolin von Sandberger (1826–1898), German palaeontologist and geologist
- Martin Sandberger (1911–2010), Nazi German SS functionary
