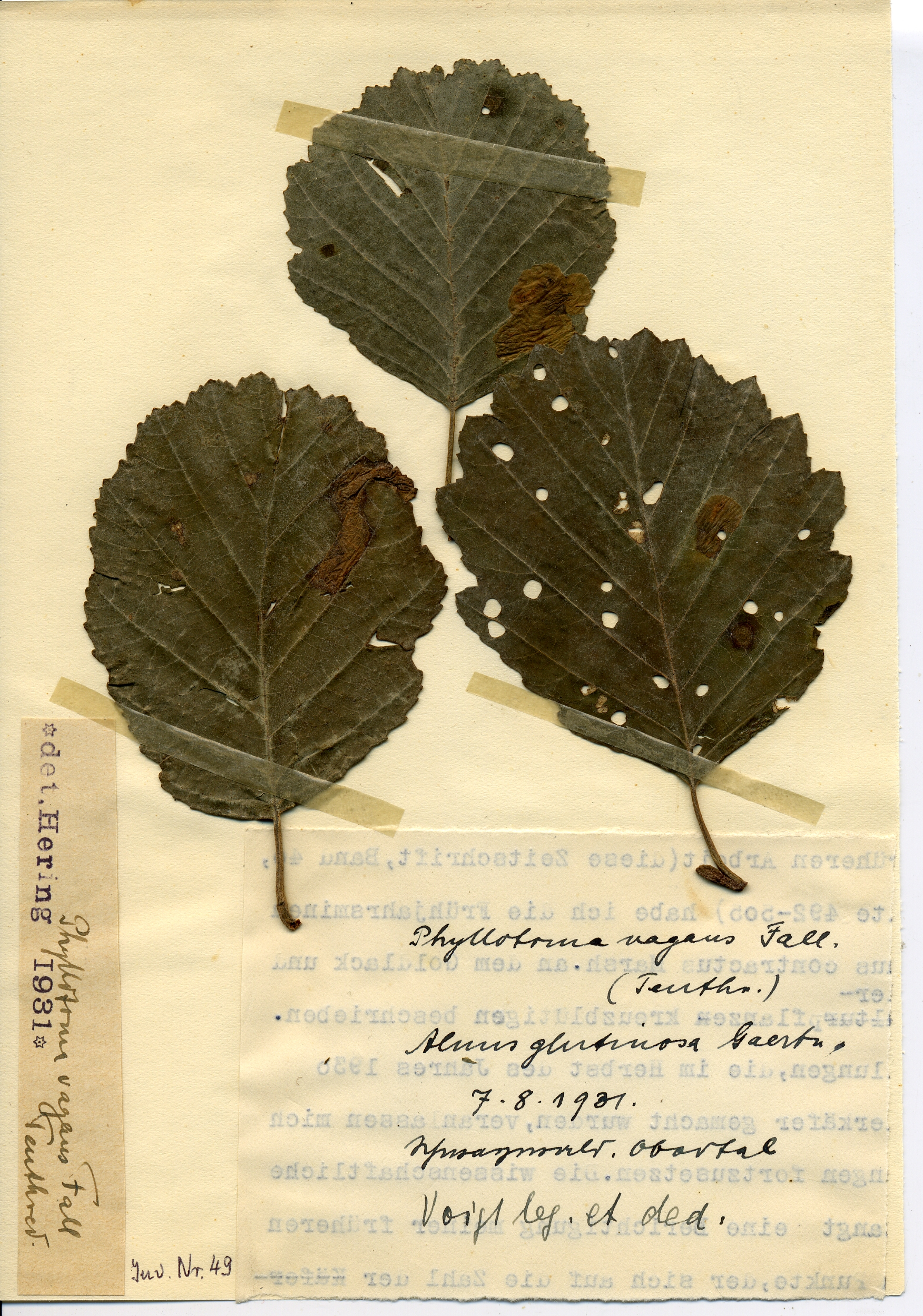
- Heterarthrus vagans leafmine Museum Wiesbaden

Scientific classification
- Domain: Eukaryota
- Kingdom: Animalia
- Phylum: Arthropoda
- Class: Insecta
- Order: Hymenoptera
- Suborder: Symphyta
- Family: Tenthredinidae
- Genus: Heterarthrus
- Species: H. vagans

Binomial name
- Heterarthrus vagans (Fallen, 1808)

= Heterarthrus vagans =

Species of sawfly

Heterarthrus vagans is a Palearctic species of sawfly.
