= Museum Wiesbaden =

Museum of art and natural history in Hesse, Germany

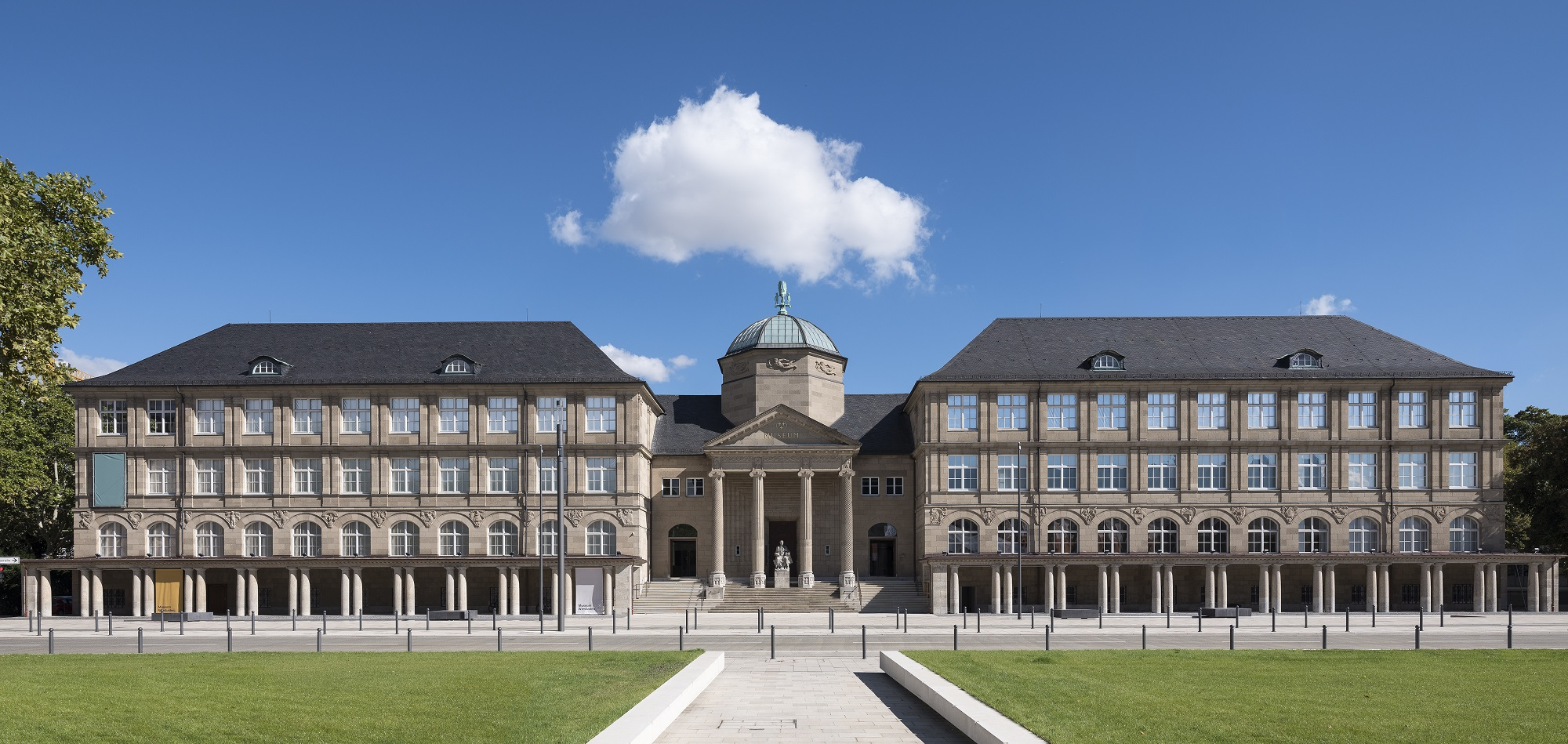
- Museum Wiesbaden
- Established: 1920
- Location: Wiesbaden, Germany
- Coordinates: 50°04′39″N 8°14′45″E
- Website: museum-wiesbaden.de/en/

The Museum Wiesbaden is a two-branch museum of art and natural history in the Hessian capital of Wiesbaden, Germany. It is one of the five Hessian State museums, in addition to the museums in Kassel, Darmstadt, Saalburg, and Glauberg.

== History ==
The foundation of the originally three museums traces back to the citizens of the city and to Johann Wolfgang von Goethe, who stayed in Wiesbaden in 1814/1815. In 1825, he persuaded Frankfurter private collectors Johann Isaac Gerning and Johann Christian Gerning to donate their extensive collections of works of art and antiquities to the Duchy of Nassau in return for the payment of an annuity for life.

Under the responsibility of the newly founded associations, but controlled by the ducal government, the citizens of Wiesbaden and the region were able to quickly expand these collections. Together with the pieces of the Verein für Nassauische Altertumskunde und Geschichtsforschung ("Association for Nassauian Antiquity and Historical Research") founded in 1812, three originally independent museums emerged. In addition to the Verein für Nassauische Altertumskunde und Geschichtsforschung the Nassauischer Verein für Naturkunde ("Nassau Society of Natural Science)" and the Nassauischer Kunstverein ("Nassau Kunstverein") (art society) were responsible for these museums.

Following the death of the Duke, the Hereditary Prince's Palace at Wilhelmstraße, built for his son, was now available for other purposes. In contrast to other cities, at a very early stage, finding rooms for the cultural assets collected by the citizenry was possible. In 1821, the three museums and the regional library of Hessen were thus able to move into the palace, which is now the seat of the Chamber of Commerce and Industry of Wiesbaden. Around the middle of the 19th century, the building became too small, due to the busy collection activities and new acquisitions. The call for a new building became louder and louder. After the three museums came under Prussian control in 1866, the city of Wiesbaden took over these institutions in 1899. This change was generally accepted because Wiesbaden had sufficient funds at the end of the 19th century to promote culture.

According to plans by architect Theodor Fischer, the foundation stone for a new building with three wings was laid at the corner of Wilhelmstraße/Rheinstraße in 1913. Previously, the banker's mansion Mons had stood there, in which the reception building of Ludwigsbahnhof was housed until 1906. The interior design of the three houses was influenced to a large extent by the three directors and the curators, as needs differed.

The first to open was the Gemäldegalerie on 1 October 1915. In the same year, the Natural Sciences Collection was also able to move into the new building, but the Natural Sciences Museum and the Museum of Nassau Antiquities were not reopened until 15 July 1920.

Half of the picture gallery was to be used for changing exhibitions, which were carried out by the Nassauischer Kunstverein in the 1920s and early 1930s. During this time, citizens of Wiesbaden also contributed to important additions to the collections. The natural science collections showed systematic exhibitions on topics of geology, paleontology, and biology. Ecological aspects were also presented for the first time.

During the Second World War, the building was partly used for military purposes. With few exceptions, the collections survived the war unscathed, but the exhibitions were dismantled and most of the showcases were damaged. Only slowly were the rooms able to regain their original function after renovation. This delay had another reason; the Americans, who moved to Wiesbaden after 1945, turned the museum into a Central Collecting Point. Temporarily stored art treasures were shown, such as the bust of Nefertiti or the painting The Man with the Golden Helmet, which was attributed to Rembrandt at the time.

After their return, a collection was rebuilt from the 1950s onwards with very few resources. Clemens Weiler played a major role in the construction of the Alexej von Jawlensky-Collection, which is today the most important collection of the house. The Natural Science Museum was largely rebuilt by Friedrich Heineck, who was impeached from office during the war. The aim of the museum was to show in particular information on the biomes in the exhibitions. The reconstruction was not entirely successful, partly because rooms were still being used by other organizations such as an American library and an urban archive.

In 1973, the three museums came into the possession of the state of Hesse. Since that time, they have been united in a three-division house, the Museum Wiesbaden. The Nassauischer Kunstverein ("Nassau Kunstverein"), which had previously been housed in the museum, was moved to the historic villa on Wilhelmstraße 15 in the immediate vicinity. Since 2010, Alexander Klar has been director of the museum. He succeeded Volker Rattemeyer, who ran the museum for 23 years. Under his leadership in 2007, it was elected by the International Association of Art Critics as Museum of the Year.

From 1994 to 1997, Kassel architects Schultze and Schulze completely renovated the rooms of the art collection, from 2003 to 2006 the roofs, the entrance area and the lecture hall, and opened up new exhibition rooms of the art collection. From 2007 to 2012, the north and south wings were renovated. In the north wing, the natural history collection was shown again from 2013 onwards. According to press and state government reports, the collection of Nassauian antiquities SNA was handed over to the city of Wiesbaden in 2009. The Old Masters are to be shown in the freed south wing.

Since 2013, the natural history collection is now exhibited in the north wing. The Collection of Nassau Antiquities is now shown at the Stadtmuseum am Markt in Wiesbaden. In the freed south wing, the Old Masters are presented in connection with contemporary art

The chronological sequence was abandoned in favour of spaces on the themes of "religion", "portrait", "mythology", "still life", and "landscape".

== Art collection ==
The museum's art collection dates back to the former collection of Johann Isaak von Gerning from Frankfurt. Through purchases, donations, and loans, the art collection has become one of the most important in Germany, especially in the area of the 19th and 20th centuries. The Museum Wiesbaden endeavours to identify Nazi plunder in its own collection, and if necessary, to return it to the legitimate heirs. In October 2014, the museum therefore launched a spectacular campaign entitled Wiesbaden schafft die Wende! ("Wiesbaden is making the turn!") The painting Die Labung by Hans von Marées, stolen by the Nazi regime in 1935, came into the possession of the museum in 1980. It was still shown in the context of this action, but only the reverse of the painting. In the beginning of November, when donations had already raised enough money for the now legitimate purchase, the painting was returned.

=== Sculptures ===
Sculptures do not play a significant role in the art collection of the Museum Wiesbaden. However, some interesting works are represented. French sculpture of the late 19th and early 20th centuries is presented with a work by one of its main representatives, Aristide Maillol's Badende. The German sculptors of the first half of the 20th century are represented by Max Klinger (portrait bust of Friedrich Nietzsche, circa 1910), Franz von Stuck, Georg Kolbe, Wilhelm Lehmbruck, Gerhard Marcks, Emy Roeder, and Ernst Barlach (Der Tod, 1925).

=== Graphic art ===
Compared to the collection of paintings, the graphic art collection is less important. Work before 1800 is scarce. In the 19th century, though, a number of works are represented by those of Ludwig Knaus, Arnold Böcklin, Hans von Marées, and Max Slevogt, among others. In the first half of the 20th century, the expressionists stand out, especially Alexej von Jawlensky (see Alexej von Jawlensky-Collection, excellently represented with drawings, woodcuts, and lithographs). These include works by Die Brücke artists such as Ernst Ludwig Kirchner, Erich Heckel, and Karl Schmidt-Rottluff, as well as works by the artists of the Blaue Reiter-Editorial Association. Of particular note are works by Franz Marc, August Macke, and above all, Wassily Kandinsky's watercolour Allerheiligen ("All Saints", 1910) from the collection of Hanna Bekker vom Rath.

Works by other artists of the time, such as Edvard Munch, Otto Dix, Oskar Kokoschka, Käthe Kollwitz, and Pablo Picasso, can also be found. Constructivist works, including those by László Moholy-Nagy, the artist couple Robert Michel and Ella Bergmann-Michel, and Friedrich Vordemberge-Gildewart, form another focal point of the collection. The graphic art collection after 1945 is extensive, which is why only a few names are mentioned here. Informalism is represented by works by Karl Otto Götz, Otto Greis, and Bernard Schultze. Further sheets from the 1940s and 1950s come from Willi Baumeister, HAP Grieshaber, and especially the extensive Ernst Wilhelm Nay collection. Minimalist tendencies are shown in the works of Sol LeWitt. Pop art is represented by Thomas Bayrle and others.

=== Old Masters ===
Compared to the 19th- and 20th-century collections, the Old Masters are rarely represented in the museum. The focus is on Italian and Dutch artists from the 15th century onwards. The most important Italians are Prospero Fontana, Albertino Piazza (Heimsuchung Mariae, Visitation of Mary), Domenico Tintoretto, Marietta Robusti, Sebastiano del Piombo, Alessandro Rosi, Luca Giordano, Francesco Solimena, Sebastiano Ricci, Cristoforo Munari, and Gennaro Greco.

Dutch painting is represented by artists such as Joos van Cleve (Christuskind mit Weintraube, "Christ Child with Grape"), Albrecht Bouts, Otto van Veen, Joos de Momper, Frans Floris, Roelant Savery, Gerard van Honthorst, Willem van de Velde, Willem van de Velde, Jan Lievens, Frans Snyders (Stillleben, Still Life), and Nicolaes Berchem.

Late German Gothic and Renaissance art is represented by the Master of the Heisterbach Altar, the Master of the Holy Family, Lucas Cranach the Elder, Bartholomew Bruyn the Elder, and Hans Muelich. German Baroque and Classicism is represented by Johann Conrad Seekatz and January Zick, Nicolas Treu, Johann Georg Platzer, and Angelika Kauffmann (Bildnis Johann Isaak von Gerning, 1798 – Portrait of Johann Isaak von Gerning). English painting is represented by Joshua Reynolds.

=== 19th-century collection ===
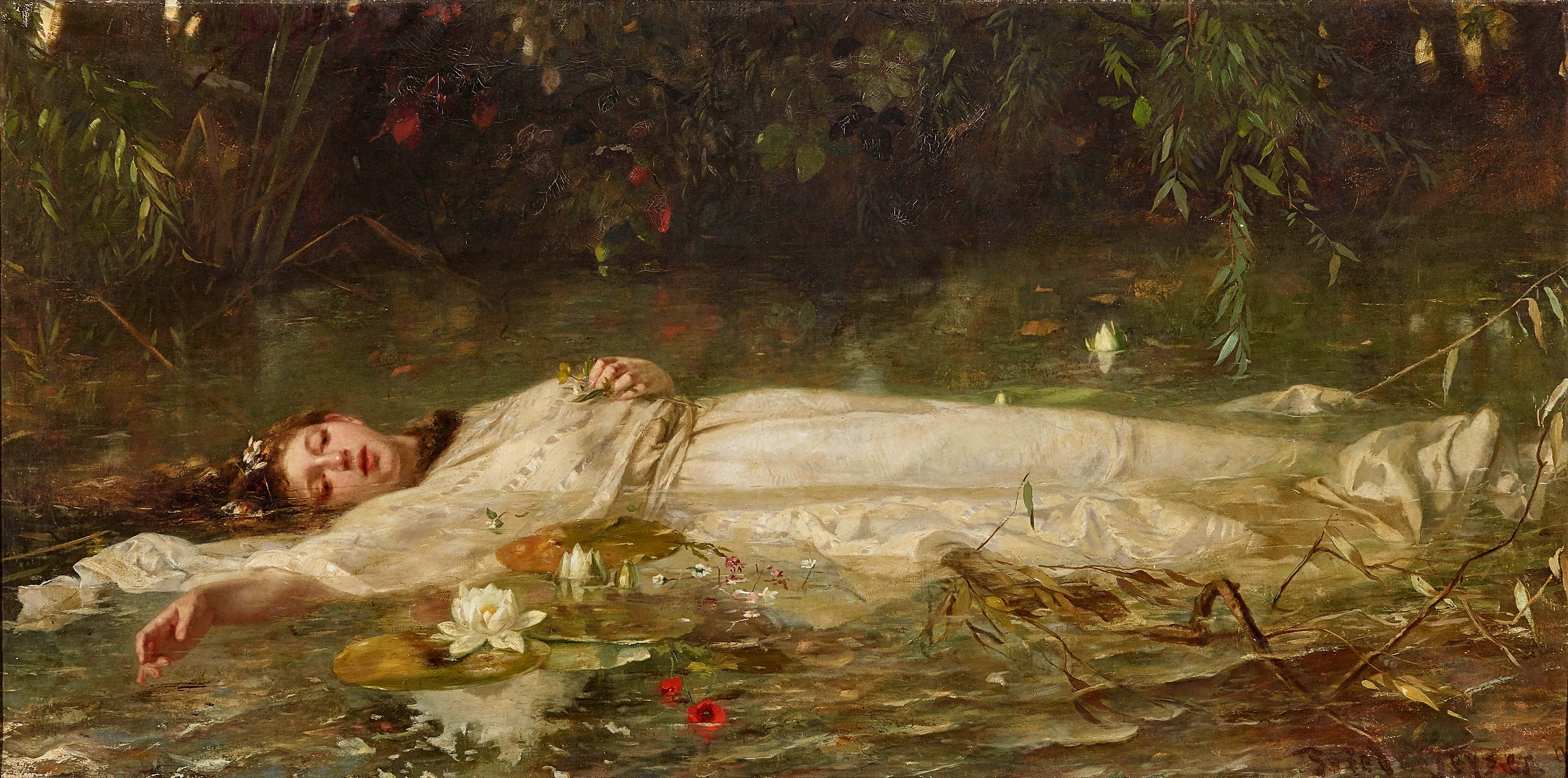
Friedrich Heyser's Ophelia, circa 1900, on exhibit at the Museum Wiesbaden

The 19th century is excellently represented in the collection. Although the great names and French Impressionism are missing, a broad overview for this period is guaranteed. With artists such as Wilhelm von Kobell, Carl Morgenstern and Georg Waldmueller, German genre painting is particularly well represented. Ludwig Knaus from Wiesbaden, who at his time was equally important as Adolph von Menzel, is represented in practically no other museum here. His Spaziergang im Tuileriengarten ("Walk in the Tuilerie Garden") of around 1855 is an early approach to Impressionism, from which he later withdrew.

The Düsseldorf school of painting is represented by several works of the brothers Andreas Achenbach and Oswald Achenbach. The Deutschrömer – German artists and writers who lived in Rome – are represented by Anselm Feuerbach (Nanna, 1861), Arnold Böcklin and Hans von Marées. Karl Friedrich Lessing and Johann Wilhelm Schirmer are also featured. Carl Spitzweg (The Butterflycatcher, around 1840), Wilhelm von Kaulbach, Franz von Lenbach and Franz von Stuck form the counterpart of the Munich School.

The Leibl-Kreis in Munich is represented extensively, especially by Wilhelm Trübner, but also Hans Thoma, Carl Schuch and Otto Scholderer are present with paintings in the collection. French realism is featured with works by Gustave Courbet, Jean-François Millet and Charles-François Daubigny, while Russian realism is represented by a work by the Alexej von Jawlensky teacher Ilya Repin from the Ernst Alfred Aye Collection.

The collection of this century ends with the works of the main representatives of German Impressionism, Max Liebermann and above all Lovis Corinth, of whom the museum owns five paintings (Portrait von Frau Halbe, 1898) as well as Oskar Moll (Havelkähne, 1907) and Christian Rohlfs.

=== Jawlensky-Collection ===
The works of the Russian artist Alexej von Jawlensky, who spent the last twenty years of his life in Wiesbaden, are outstanding in the collection of the Museum Wiesbaden. With 57 paintings and 35 graphics, the museum has the largest collection of this artist besides the Norton Simon Museum in Pasadena. The collection includes early works such as Stillleben mit Krug und Buch ("Still Life with Jug and Book", around 1902), many expressive major works such as Dame mit Fächer ("Woman with a Fan", 1909), Nikita (1910) or Selbstbildnis ("Self-portrait", 1912) and, above all, many works of the paintings in series, such as the variations Von Frühling, Glück und Sonne ("Of Spring, Happiness and Sun", 1917) or the Abstract Heads created in Wiesbaden as Kopf in Rot-Weiß-Gold ("Head in Red-White-Gold", 1927) and the meditations as Mein Geist wird weiterleben ("My Spirit will live on", 1935).

Remarkable among the Still lifes is the painting Stillleben mit schwarzer Vase ("Still Life with Black Vase", 1910) and among the paintings of landscapes by Jawlensky the work Blaue Berge ("Blue Mountains", 1912). The collection of graphics include lithographs such as Liegender weiblicher Akt("Lying female nude", 1912) and drawings including Konstantinowka mit geneigtem Kopf ("Konstantinovka with inclined head", circa 1912). Most recently, the collection has been extended by eleven paintings and three drawings from the Hanna Bekker vom Rath Collection in 1987, including the portrait Bildnis Marianne von Werefkin ("Portrait of Marianne von Werefkin") from 1906.

From 17 September 2021, to March 2022 the museum shows Alles! 100 Jahre Jawlensky in Wiesbaden (All! 100 years of Jawlensky in Wiesbaden) – an anniversary show celebrating the history of the collection with a complete exhibition of the works of expressionist Alexej von Jawlensky.

=== Expressionists and the Hanna Bekker vom Rath collection ===
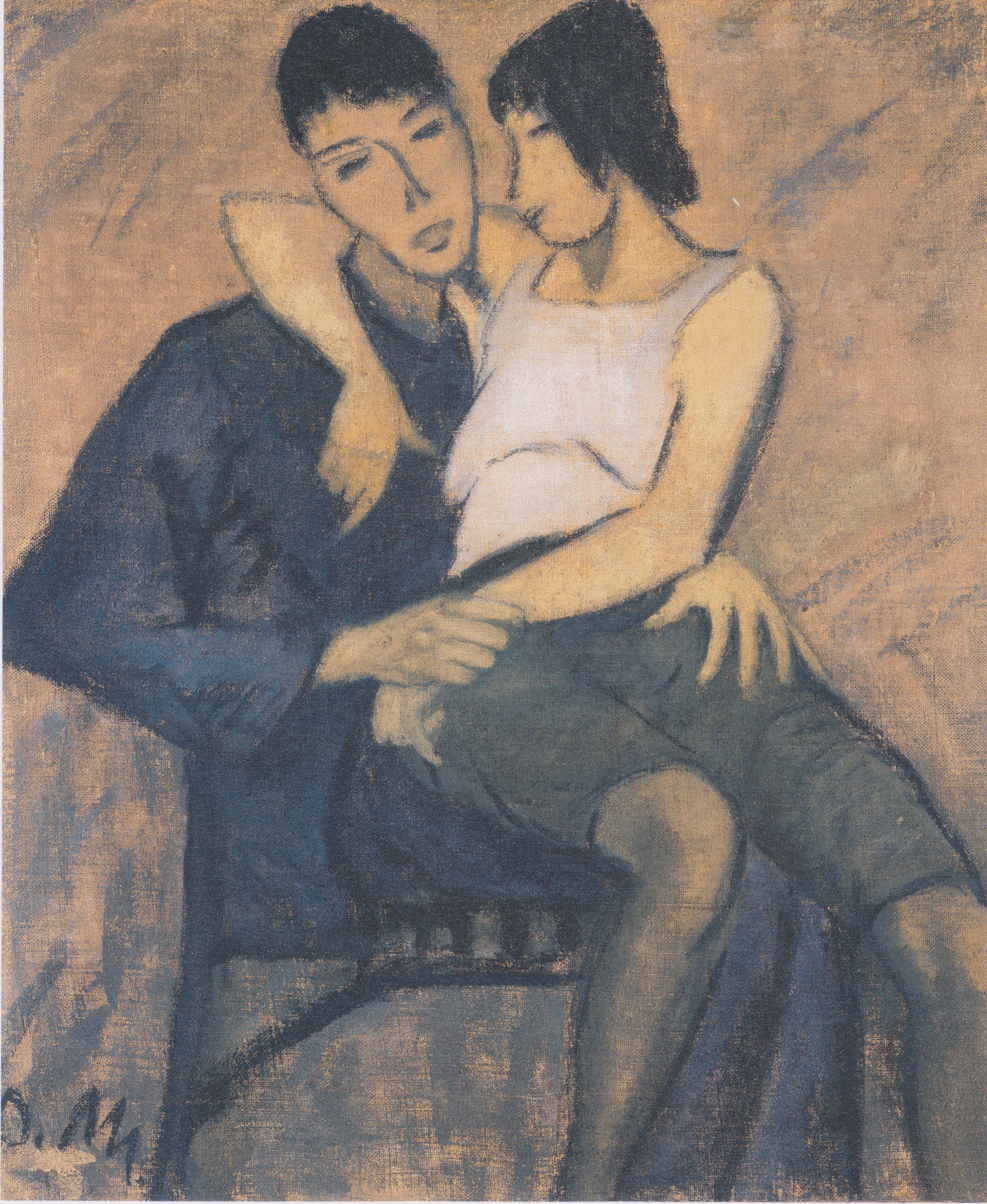
Two Lovers (Liebespaar) by Otto Mueller, circa 1914, glue paint on plucking, 101.5 x 83.5 cm

Even before World War II, the Museum Wiesbaden had an important collection of Expressionism. In addition, the collection of the Wiesbaden art collector and patron Heinrich Kirchhoff was regularly exhibited, with which many modernist works could be shown. With the Nazi confiscation campaign under the title Entartete Kunst all modern works of art were removed from the museum, so that one had to start again after the war. High quality works were purchased from Paula Modersohn-Becker, Otto Mueller (Liebespaar) ("Love Couple", 1925), Emil Nolde, Walter Jacob, Conrad Felixmüller (Familienbildnis Kirchhoff, "Kirchhoff family portrait", 1920), Karl Hofer and above all from Jawlensky's companion Marianne von Werefkin (Schindelfabrik, "Schindel Factory", around 1910). In addition, a work of the Russian Natalia Goncharova was acquired. A milestone in the history of the art collection was the acquisition of a large part of the Hanna Bekker vom Rath collection. With this collection, the museum not only received 11 paintings and three drawings by Jawlensky, but also 16 other works of Classical Modernism. Graphics by Wassily Kandinsky and August Macke as well as paintings by Ernst Ludwig Kirchner, Erich Heckel (painting Maske vor Buschbockfell, "Mask in front of Buschbockfell", 1913), Adolf Hölzel, Ida Kerkovius, Willi Baumeister and Ernst Wilhelm Nay have enriched the collection ever since. In addition, there are five paintings by Karl Schmidt-Rottluff, among which the painting Selbstportrait ("Self portrait", 1919), and two paintings by Max Beckmann, including the famous Weiblicher Akt mit Hund ("Female Nude with Dog", 1927). After this great enrichment, further individual works from this collection were acquired, to mention above all Jawlensky's painting Heilandsgesicht: Ruhendes Licht ("Face of Salvation: Resting Light") from 1921.

=== Constructivist artists ===
Constructivist art is a focal theme in the collection of the Museum Wiesbaden. Although some of the big names are missing, the collection still offers a good overview. Among others, László Moholy-Nagy with his painting Architektur III (1920), Erich Buchholz, Walter Dexel as well as the post-war artists Klaus Staudt, Günter Fruhtrunk and François Morellet are included here. There are large complexes of works by the artist couple Robert Michel and Ella Bergmann-Michel, Anton Stankowski, and above all by Friedrich Vordemberge-Gildewart with the painting complex K 116 (1940). His archive is maintained by the museum.

=== Art since 1945 ===
The Art collection of the Museum Wiesbaden is one of the most important art collections in Germany after 1945. It starts with Art Informel. Here the German artists Karl Otto Götz (Krakmo, 1958), Otto Greis, Heinz Kreutz, Fred Thieler, Emil Schumacher, Hann Trier, Gerhard Hoehme and Bernard Schultze (Venen und Tang, "Veins and Seaweed", 1955) are shown. The museum owns several of Bernard Schultze's Migofs, a title which he attached to his sculptural works. The other positions of art of the 1940s and 1950s are envisioned by Ernst Wilhelm Nay with his painting Afrikanisch ("African", 1954), Willi Baumeister, Max Ackermann, Rolf Cavael, Fritz Winter and above all the painter Otto Ritschl from Wiesbaden with his painting Komposition (1955).

These artists are followed by abstract painting artists such as Rupprecht Geiger, Ulrich Erben, Bruno Erdmann and Gotthard Graubner. The ZERO group and kinetic art are featured by artists such as Günther Uecker with his work Spirale Weiß ("White spiral", 1963), Rolf Kissel, Hermann Goepfert, Heinz Mack and Adolf Luther. Also Sigmar Polke and, above all, Gerhard Richter belong to the collection. The museum possesses five paintings by Richter, including the famous Ein Wunder rettete ("A Miracle Saved", 1964). Surrealism is illustrated by two paintings by Max Ernst.

In 1962 the legendary first Fluxus Festival took place in the museum. Of this period, the museum holds works by Joseph Beuys, Wolf Vostell and Nam June Paik. His work Zen for Head (1962) is part of the collection. The American post-war art is featured by some of its main protagonists by works of Mark Rothko, Ad Reinhardt and Agnes Martin. Also listed in the collection are artists such as Sol LeWitt, Donald Judd, Robert Mangold, Fred Sandback, Dan Flavin and Brice Marden. The museum also has the largest collection of works (graphics, paintings and objects) by the German-American Eva Hesse. One of her works is the wall object Eighter from Decatur (1965). The painting of the 1970s and 1980s is portrayed by artists such as Georg Baselitz with his work Stillleben ("Still Life", 1969), Eugen Schönebeck, Jörg Immendorff and Thomas Bayrle.

An outstanding focus of the collection is the Installation art and object art of the last thirty years. The most important artists in the collection are Dietrich Helms, Jeppe Hein, Rebecca Horn, Thomas Huber, Vollrad Kutscher, Ingeborg Lüscher, Christiane Möbus, Norbert Radermacher, Franz Erhard Walther and Dorothee von Windheim with her work Fassade III (in English Facade III) (1979). In addition, there are works of international artists such as Ilya Kabakov with his work Der Rote Waggon ("The Red Wagon", 1991), Micha Ullman, Richard Serra, Jochen Gerz with his composition Der Transsibirische-Prospekt ("Trans-Siberian View", 1977) and Christian Boltanski. Modernist sculpture is represented by Katsura Funakoshi with his work of art A Tale of the Sphinx (2004).

=== Art awards ===
Although the Museum Wiesbaden does not award any art awards itself, two of them are closely linked to the museum.

==== Alexej von Jawlensky Prize ====
On the occasion of the 50th anniversary of his death in 1991, the city of Wiesbaden established the Alexei von Jawlensky Prize, endowed with 18,000 Euros. Alexei von Jawlensky (1865–1941) was an important Russian artist in the first half of the 20th century who spent the last twenty years of his life in Wiesbaden. The prize is awarded every five years and has so far been awarded six times. The prize includes the purchase of a work for the Museum Wiesbaden and a special exhibition on the work of the winner in the Museum Wiesbaden.

The previous laureates were:

- 1991: Agnes Martin
- 1996: Robert Mangold
- 2001: Brice Marden
- 2006: Rebecca Horn
- 2010: Ellsworth Kelly
- 2014: Richard Serra
- 2022: Frank Stella
- 2027: Suzan Frecon

==== Otto Ritschl Prize ====
The Otto Ritschl Prize was established by the Museumsverein Otto Ritschl e. V. in 2001. Otto Ritschl (1885–1976) was an important German post-war artist who lived in Wiesbaden until his death. An international jury awards the prize at irregular intervals, which is associated with a cash reward and an exhibition at the Museum Wiesbaden.

The previous laureates were:

- 2001 Gotthard Graubner
- 2003 Ulrich Erben
- 2009 Kazuo Katase
- 2015 Katharina Grosse
- 2020 Sławomir Elsner

== Natural history collections ==
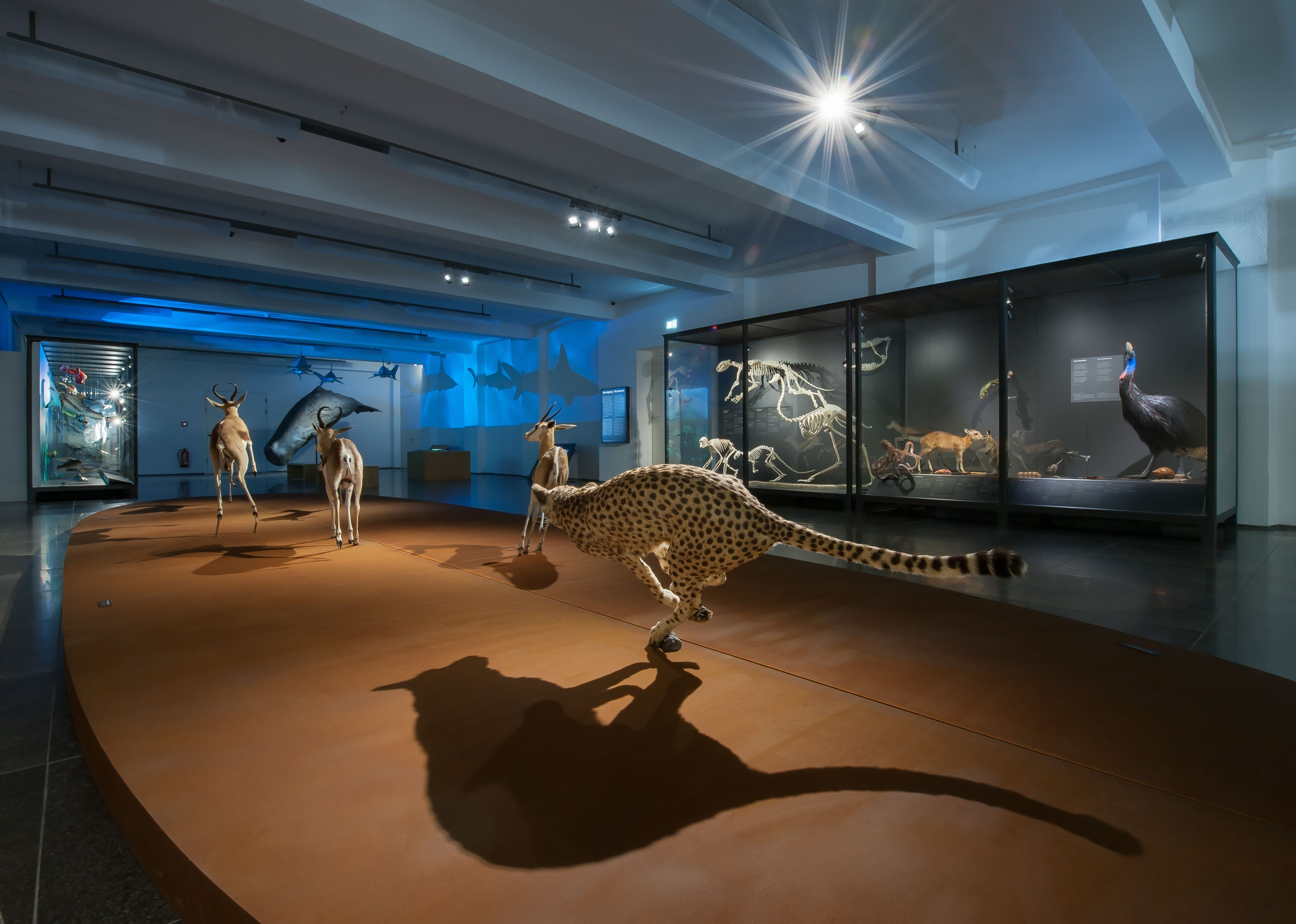
Exhibition on Movements

The originally independent Museum of Natural History in Wiesbaden was founded in 1829 by citizens of the region with the support of the Duke together with the Nassauischer Verein für Naturkunde (Nassau Association for Natural History). The beginning of the 19th century was marked by industrialization and enormous discoveries in the natural sciences. This is how the desire for a permanent institution was born. On the one hand, this offered the opportunity to establish an important place of education for the public and, on the other hand, to promote internal research. These goals are still pursued by today's natural history collections. One can find more information on this at the site of the Museum Wiesbaden.

=== Scientific collections ===
Originally the collection was intended to cover nature of the Duchy of Nassau. However, as the duchy lacked a university and international collections had to be integrated with the founding of the museum, this approach was abandoned. Now the natural history collections belong to the larger ones in Germany with material from all regions of the world.

About one million individual objects and series are available to science and public relations. Several thousand first described specimens serve in particular research into biodiversity. With few exceptions, the collection survived the Second World War. A large part of the collection is documented in catalog, on index cards and digitally. Larger gaps exist especially in the areas of geology and invertebrate animals. Digital photographs are also available of numerous items in the collection.

==== General geology and mineralogy ====
The mineral collection is still completely in its 19th-century form, as the exhibition combines both scientific and display collections in vitrines. In addition to a general mineral collection of worldwide origin, the focus is on finds from the region, which document in particular the mining industry, which was important until a few decades ago. The scientific collection comprises about 14,000 pieces, currently listed in a computerized catalog.

==== Geological history ====
Three geological eras are particularly represented in the immediate region of Wiesbaden. About 50,000 fossils are documented. From the recent history of the earth there are testimonies from the Pleistocene, which originate in particular from the Mosbacher Sande. Regularly Rhine and Main had dammed up in front of the Middle Rhine Valley and bones carried along remained in the sediment. Especially from the warm periods numerous fossils are preserved. A second focal point is the find area at the Caves of Steeden, where the oldest artefacts of Hesse were found. One of the most important collections is related to the following two earth ages. It is the largest part of the legacy of the brothers Guido and Fridolin Sandberger.

The Mainz Basin bears witness to the world of life in the Paleogene. In this warmer phase after the extinction of the dinosaurs, the Mainz basin was regularly connected to the surrounding seas, in between these connections were lost, the inland sea sweetened out, a lake was formed and finally the water disappeared completely. In this change numerous animal species lived here, so there are traces of, amongst others, manatees, basking sharks, reef-forming mussel banks, but also land creatures, such as the Deinotherium, which was found in Eppelsheim.

Artefacts from the Taunus tend to originate from the Devonian, an equally warm time with a high sea level. The collection contains evidence of a flourishing marine fauna: trilobites, conodonts and graptolites. Other artefacts include a Palaeozoic and mesozoic fish collection, an extensive Mesozoic vertebrate collection, a complete ichthyosaur specimen of Holzmaden, a paleontological reference collection from the hydrobiic layer of the Mainz Basin, a Cephalopods and a Brachiopodes collection, and a collection of fossils from the Taunus quartzite (incl. Trace fossils).

== Repatriation ==
In 2023 the museum was one of seven German museums and universities to return Māori and Moriori remains to the Museum of New Zealand Te Papa Tongarewa in New Zealand.
