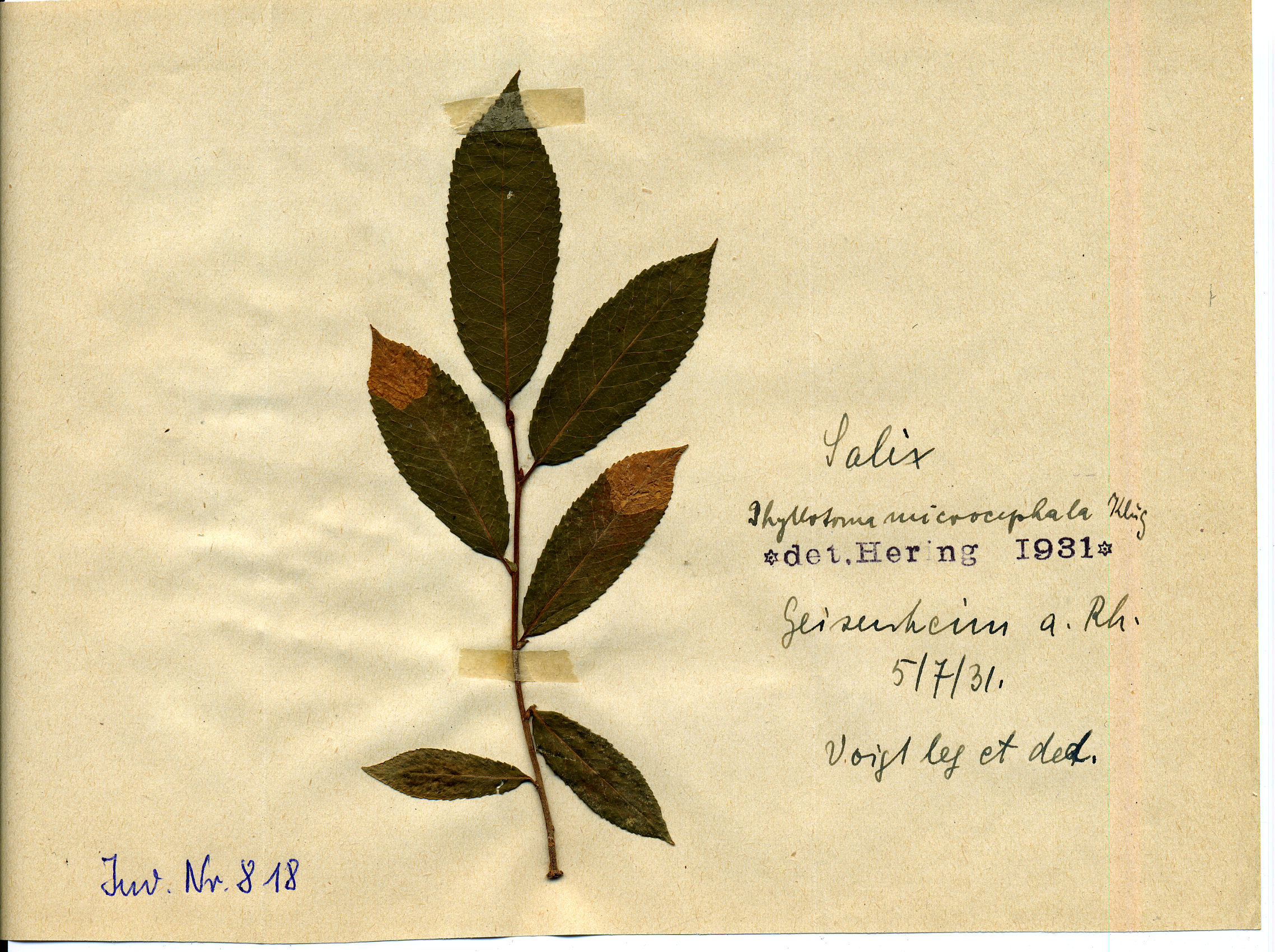
- Heterarthrus microcephalus leafmine Museum Wiesbaden

Scientific classification
- Domain: Eukaryota
- Kingdom: Animalia
- Phylum: Arthropoda
- Class: Insecta
- Order: Hymenoptera
- Suborder: Symphyta
- Family: Tenthredinidae
- Genus: Heterarthrus
- Species: H. microcephalus

Binomial name
- Heterarthrus microcephalus (Klug, 1818)

= Heterarthrus microcephalus =

Species of sawfly

Heterarthrus microcephalus is a Palearctic species of sawfly.
