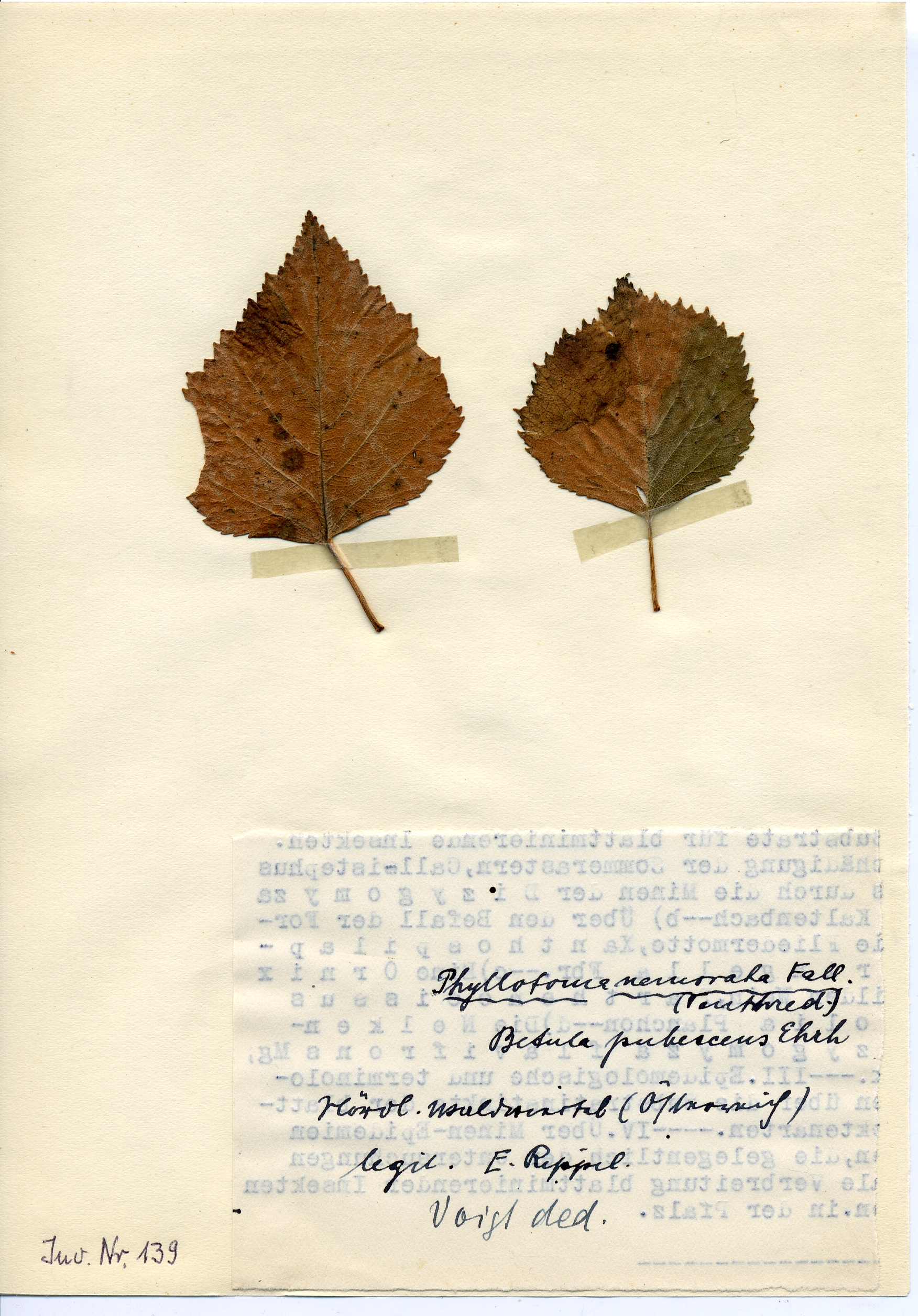
- Heterarthrus nemoratus leafmine Museum Wiesbaden

Scientific classification
- Kingdom: Animalia
- Phylum: Arthropoda
- Clade: Pancrustacea
- Class: Insecta
- Order: Hymenoptera
- Suborder: Symphyta
- Family: Tenthredinidae
- Genus: Heterarthrus
- Species: H. nemoratus

Binomial name
- Heterarthrus nemoratus (Fallen, 1808)

Synonyms
- Fenusa parviceps

= Heterarthrus nemoratus =

Species of sawfly

Heterarthrus nemoratus is a Palearctic species of sawfly. It is a leaf-miner of birch trees.
