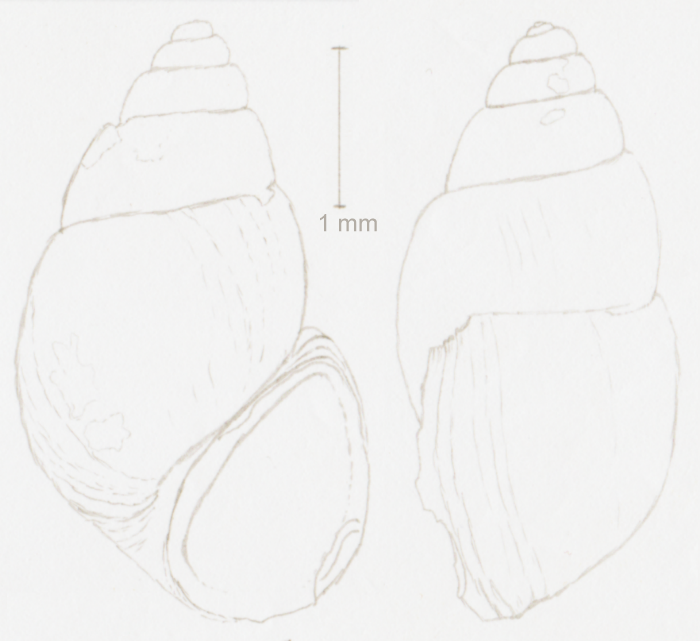
- shell of Tanousia runtoniana
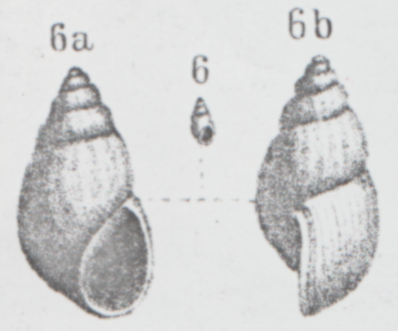
- shell of Tanousia runtoniana from its original description

Scientific classification
- Domain: Eukaryota
- Kingdom: Animalia
- Phylum: Mollusca
- Class: Gastropoda
- Subclass: Caenogastropoda
- Order: Littorinimorpha
- Family: Hydrobiidae
- Genus: †Tanousia
- Species: †T. runtoniana

Binomial name
- †Tanousia runtoniana (Sandberger, 1880)

= Tanousia runtoniana =

Extinct species of gastropod

Tanousia runtoniana is an extinct European species of freshwater snail with gills and an operculum, a gastropod mollusk in the family Lithoglyphidae.
