= Hanna Bekker vom Rath =

German painter

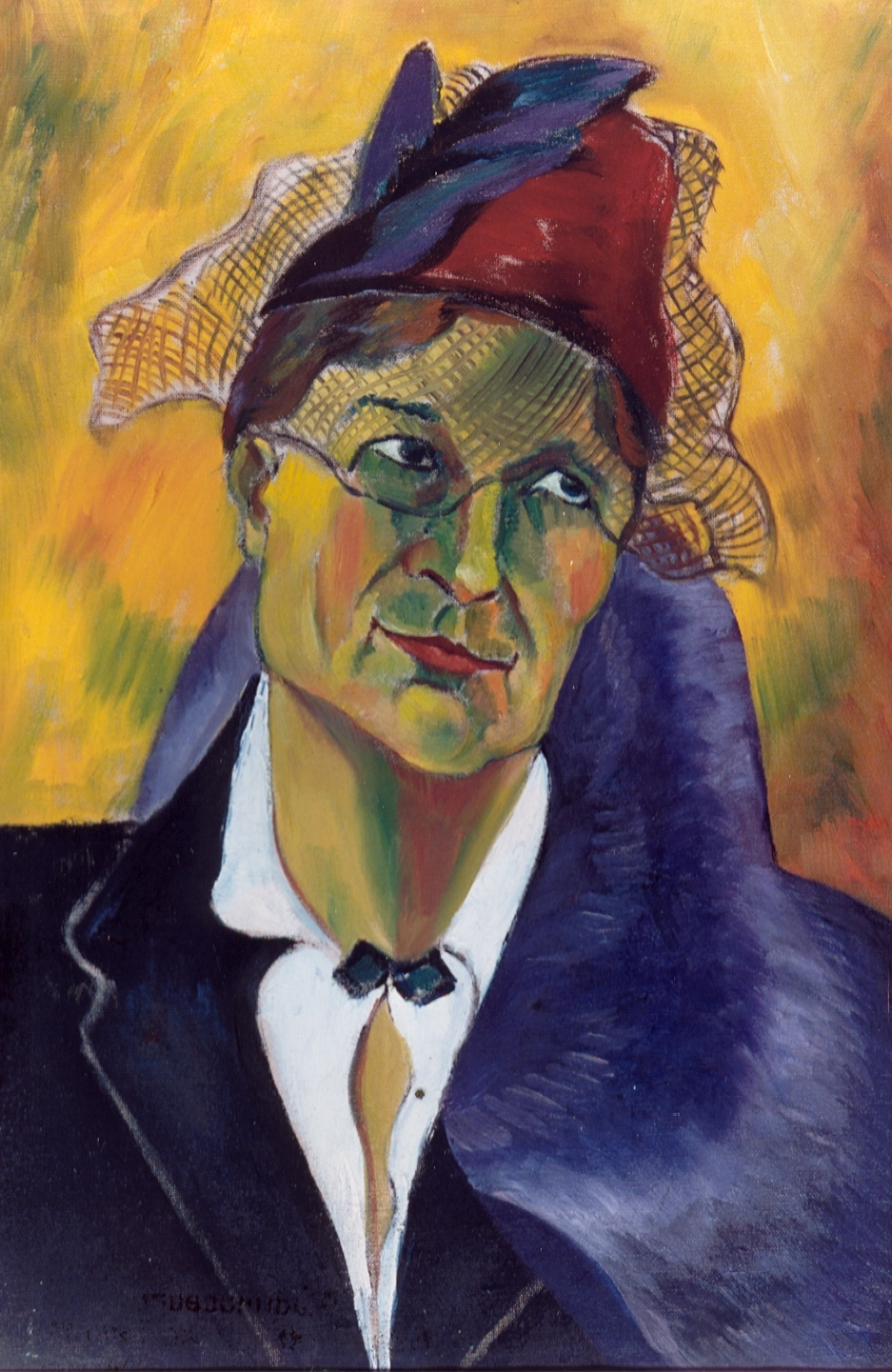
Self Portrait with Hat (c. 1948)

Hanna Bekker vom Rath (née vom Rath; 7 September 1893 – 8 August 1983) was a German painter, collector, patron and gallerist.

== Personal life ==
Hanna vom Rath, born in Frankfurt, Germany married the music critic Paul Bekker (1882–1937) in 1920 and they moved to Hofheim am Taunus, near Frankfurt/Main. They had three children. In 1930 the marriage ended in divorce.

== Career ==
Bekker vom Rath began studying painting with Ottilie Roederstein in Hofheim, Hesse. During World War I, she moved to Stuttgart, Baden-Württemberg, where she studied under Ida Kerkovius and Adolf Hölzel. Bekker vom Rath's portfolio includes "still lifes, portraits and landscapes, in styles ranging from Expressionism to New Objectivity".

=== Artist patron and art collector ===
In the twenties she became friends with Ludwig Meidner, Alexej von Jawlensky, Karl Schmidt-Rottluff, Emy Roeder, among others. Initially spontaneous support for individual artists later condensed into a sustained mission. She purchased works, invited the painters and art collectors to her Blue House in Hofheim. In 1929 she founded the "Society of Friends of the Art of Alexej von Jawlensky" in Wiesbaden. Jawlensky's catalog raisonné documents a painting with dedication to Bekker vom Rath. She received the painting, "Variation: Von Fruehling, Glueck und Sonne," as a Christmas gift in 1929. Between 1940 and 1943 Bekker vom Rath organized secret exhibitions of works by the ostracized in her Berlin studio apartment on Regensburger Strasse. In the twenties she started collecting work of Expressionism, such as from Die Brücke and Bauhaus : Karl Schmidt-Rottluff, Ernst Ludwig Kirchner, Adolf Hoelzel, Paul Klee, Max Beckmann and many more. Later international and also younger artists were included. In 1987 many of these works became part of the collection of the Museum Wiesbaden.

=== Art dealer and ambassador of art ===
Inspired by the avant-garde and moved by their persecution under the Nazi Party, she organised clandestine art exhibitions during the war. In 1947 she founded the Frankfurt Kunstkabinett Hanna Bekker vom Rath. It initially provided a forum for artist friends defamed as degenerate under the National Socialist regime. Her circle of artists and friends now included Ernst Wilhelm Nay, who settled in Hofheim from 1945 to 1952, the photographer Marta Hoepffner, who opened her private photography school there, and their teacher Willi Baumeister. Ludwig Meidner, who returned from exile, also lived in a district of Hofheim between 1955 and 1963. She re-established contact with the emigrated artists, collectors and art dealers and discovered through their reports and during her first trips to France and Switzerland that many artist emigrants had not been noticed abroad due to the twelve years of dictatorship in their host countries.

Beginning in 1952, she went on exhibition trips presenting those once ostracized and young artists in North and South America, South Africa, India, Greece, and the Middle East, becoming known as an "ambassador of art."
