= Waldemar Rösler =

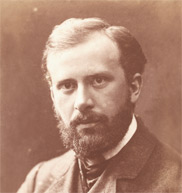
- Waldemar Rösler (date unknown)
- Born: 21 April 1882; Dresden
- Died: 14 December 1916 (aged 34); Arys

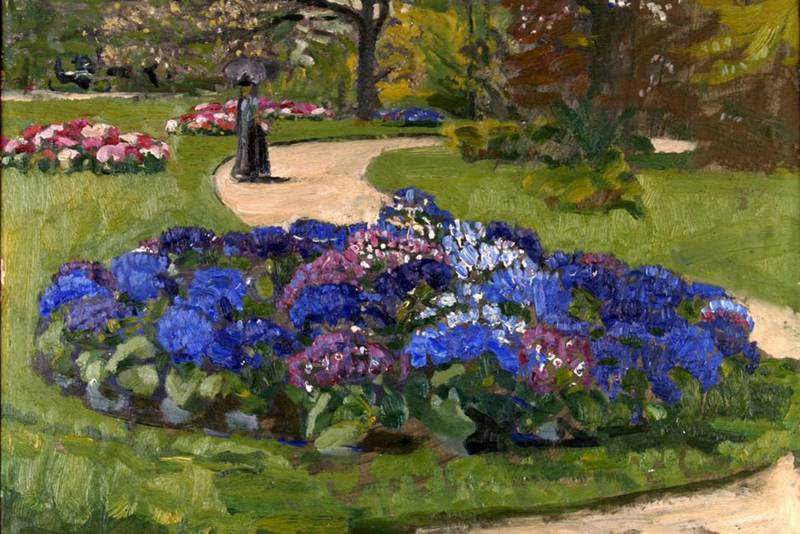
Blue Flower Bed.

Waldemar Rösler (1882-1916) was a German Impressionist landscape painter and lithographer.

== Biography ==
His father was a photographer. When he was still very young, the family moved to Königsberg where he later became an illustrator at a local newspaper. From 1896 to 1904, he attended the Kunstakademie there; studying with Max Schmidt, Emil Neide and Ludwig Dettmann, who admitted him to his Master Class. That is where he met his future wife, Oda Hardt, a student who would also become a well-known artist.

After a brief study trip to Paris and Brussels, he had his first exhibition in 1905 with the Berlin Secession. This was followed by a stay in Gut Schildeck, located between Osterode and Hohenstein, which was his fiancées birthplace. They were married in 1906 and settled in Groß-Lichterfelde, near Berlin. The following year, they had twins. Their daughter, Louise Rösler, also became an artist.

In 1908, at the 15th showing of the Secession, Max Liebermann became aware of his work and invited him to become a member. In 1911, following Liebermann's resignation, he became a member of the advisory board, under the sponsorship of Max Beckmann. He was also a member of the Deutscher Kunstlerbund

After the mobilization in 1914, he was drafted into the Landwehr and sent to the Western Front in Belgium. The following year, he was promoted to Lieutenant for his bravery. After that, he was assigned to the Occupation Administration in Brussels, where he worked with Gottfried Benn, who was then serving as a military doctor.

His physical and mental states had suffered dramatically, however, and he was taken to the Truppenübungsplatz Arys (A military training area) to be closer to his family. Not long after his arrival, he committed suicide. He was buried in his wife's family plot in Gut Schildeck.

During the Nazi régime, some of his works were classified as "degenerate". In 2004, after many years as a café, his summer home in Kühlungsborn became the Museum Atelierhaus Rösler-Kröhnke. The latter name refers to his son-in-law, Walter Kröhnke and granddaughter Anka Kröhnke; also artists.
