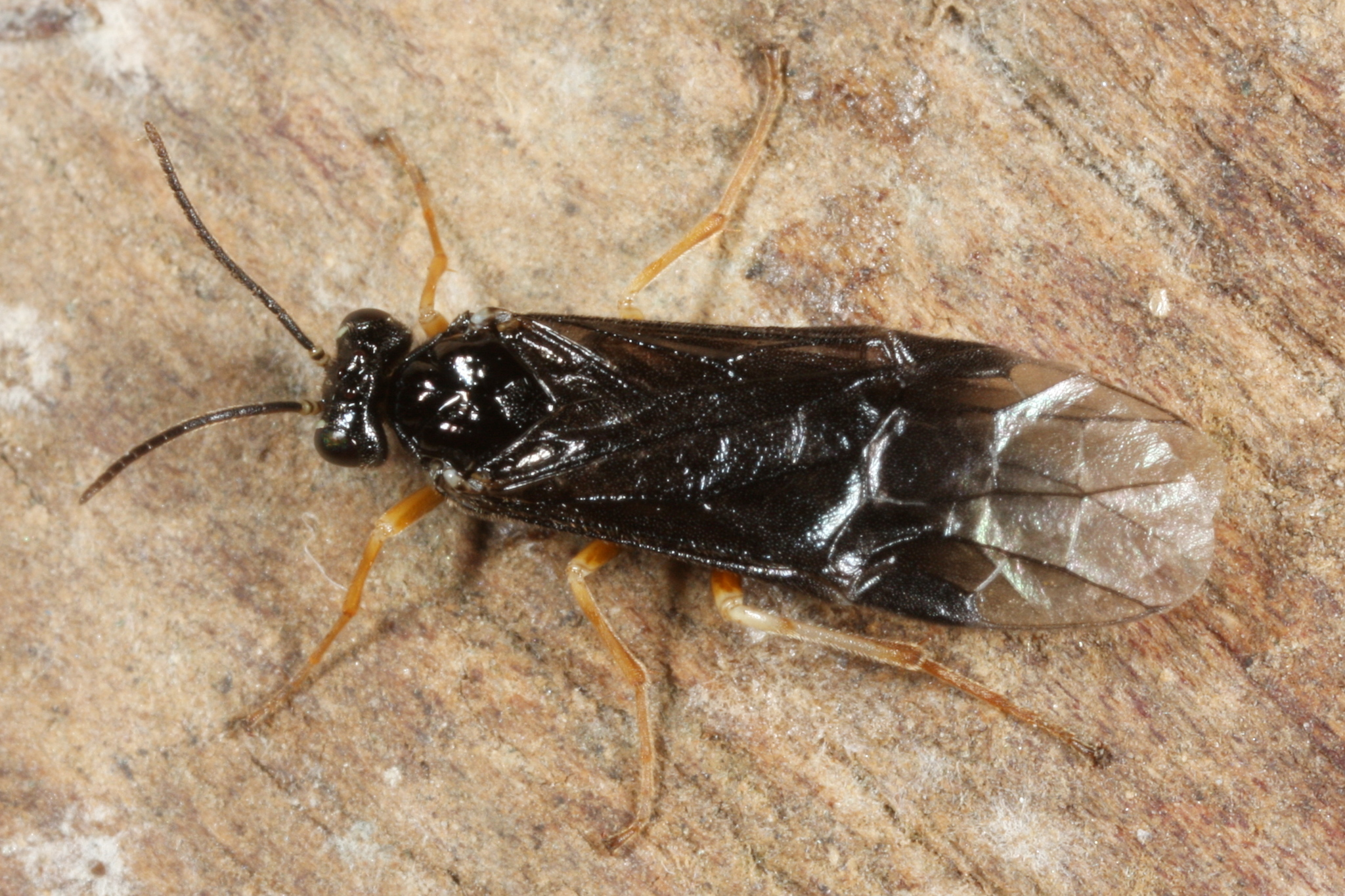
- Heterarthrus ochropoda

Scientific classification
- Kingdom: Animalia
- Phylum: Arthropoda
- Class: Insecta
- Order: Hymenoptera
- Suborder: Symphyta
- Family: Tenthredinidae
- Genus: Heterarthrus; Stephens, 1835

= Heterarthrus =

Genus of sawflies

Heterarthrus is a genus of sawflies belonging to the family Tenthredinidae.

The species of this genus are found in Eurasia and North America.

Species:

- Heterarthrus aceris (Kaltenbach, 1856)
- Heterarthrus cuneifrons Altenhofer & Zombori, 1987
- Heterarthrus cypricus W.Schedl, 2005
- Heterarthrus fasciatus (Malaise, 1931) Malaise, 1931
- Heterarthrus fiora Liston, 2019
- Heterarthrus flavicollis Gussakovskij, 1947
- Heterarthrus fruticicolum Ermolenko, 1960
- Heterarthrus imbrosensis W.Schedl, 1981
- Heterarthrus leucomela (Klug, 1818)
- Heterarthrus microcephalus (Klug, 1818)
- Heterarthrus nemoratus (Fallén, 1808)
- Heterarthrus ochropoda (Klug, 1818)
- Heterarthrus smithi Ermolenko, 1994
- Heterarthrus tauricus Ermolenko, 1984
- Heterarthrus vagans (Fallén, 1808)
- Heterarthrus vikbergi Liston, Mutanen & Viitasaari, 2019
- Heterarthrus wuestneii (Konow, 1905)
- Heterarthrus yanagi Smith & Naito, 2005
