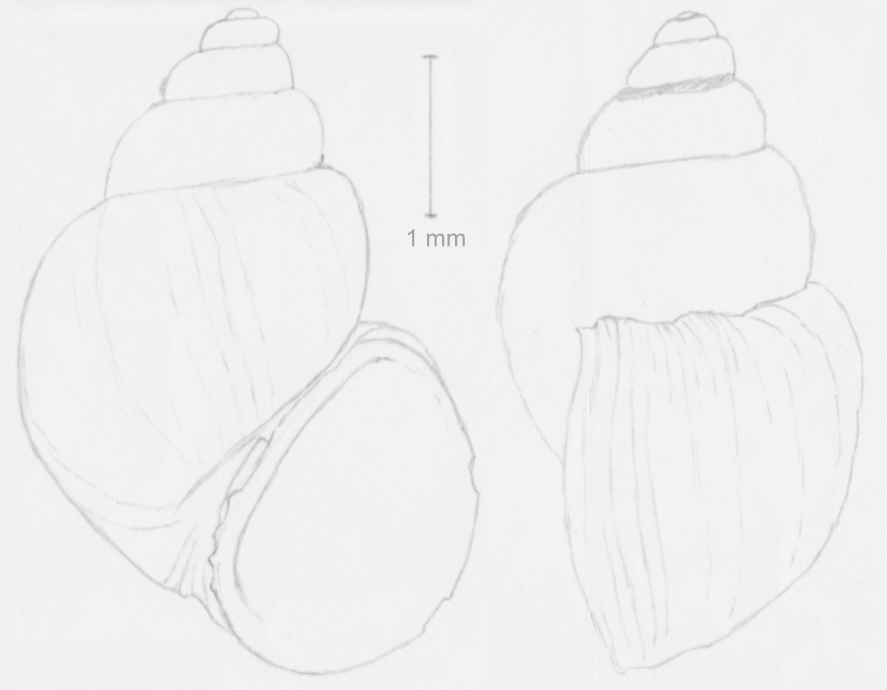
- shell of Tanousia stenostoma

Scientific classification
- Domain: Eukaryota
- Kingdom: Animalia
- Phylum: Mollusca
- Class: Gastropoda
- Subclass: Caenogastropoda
- Order: Littorinimorpha
- Family: Hydrobiidae
- Genus: †Tanousia; Servain, 1881

Synonyms
- Amnicola (Sandria) Brusina, 1886; Andrussowiella Wenz, 1939 (unavailable replacement name for "Sandria Andrusov, 1890" non Brusina, 1886; considered a synonym of Tanousia); Pseudamnicola (Andrussowiella) Wenz, 1939 (unavailable replacement name for "Sandria Andrusov, 1890" non Brusina, 1886; considered a synonym of Tanousia); Pseudamnicola (Sandria) Brusina, 1886

= Tanousia =

Extinct genus of gastropods

Tanousia is an extinct genus of freshwater snails with gills and an operculum, a gastropod mollusk in the family Lithoglyphidae.

== Species ==
Species within the genus Tanousia include:

- † Tanousia adnata (Neumayr in Herbich & Neumayr, 1875)
- † Tanousia arminiensis (Jekelius, 1932)
- † Tanousia atava (Andrusov, 1890)
- † Tanousia bodosensis (Roth, 1881)
- † Tanousia carasiensis (Jekelius, 1944)
- † Tanousia destefanii (Brusina, 1902)
- † Tanousia krasnenkovi Kondrashov, 2007 – from the Middle Pleistocene
- † Tanousia lithoglyphoides (Girotti, 1972)
- † Tanousia runtoniana (Sandberger, 1880)
- † Tanousia schlickumi Schütt, 1976
- † Tanousia stenostoma (Nordmann, 1901)
- † Tanousia stironensis Esu, 2008 – from Early Pleistocene of Northern Italy
- † Tanousia subovata (Settepassi & Verdel, 1965)
- † Tanousia zrmanjae (Brusina, 1866)
