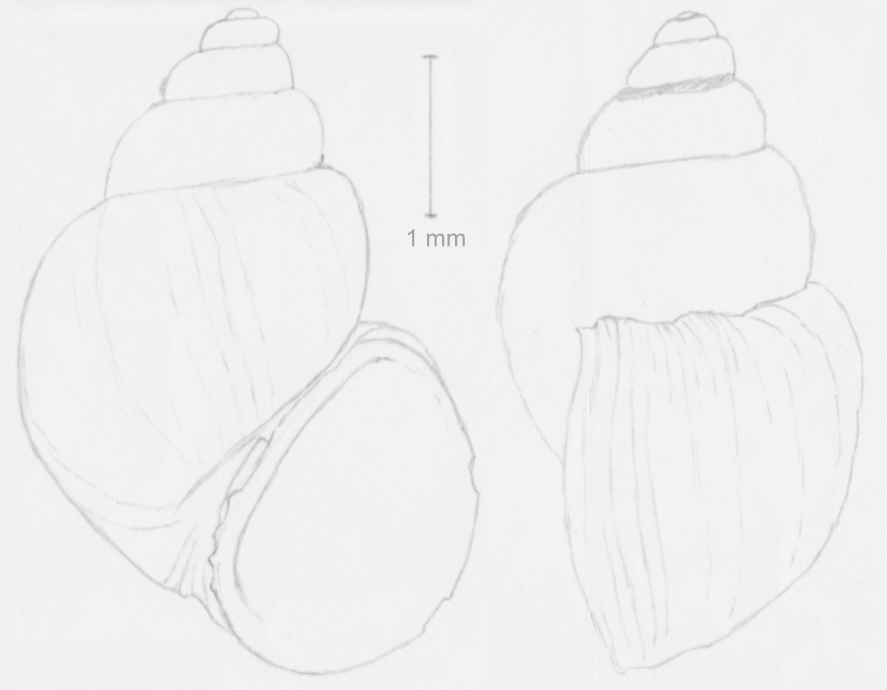
- shell of Tanousia stenostoma

Scientific classification
- Domain: Eukaryota
- Kingdom: Animalia
- Phylum: Mollusca
- Class: Gastropoda
- Subclass: Caenogastropoda
- Order: Littorinimorpha
- Family: Hydrobiidae
- Genus: †Tanousia
- Species: †T. stenostoma

Binomial name
- †Tanousia stenostoma (Nordmann, 1901)

Synonyms
- Nematurella stenostoma Nordmann, 1901

= Tanousia stenostoma =

Extinct species of gastropod

Tanousia stenostoma is an extinct European species of freshwater snail with gills and an operculum, a gastropod mollusk in the family Lithoglyphidae.
