= Walter Kröhnke =

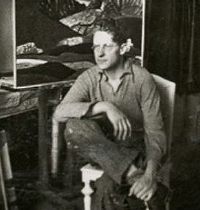
Walter Kröhnke (1930s)

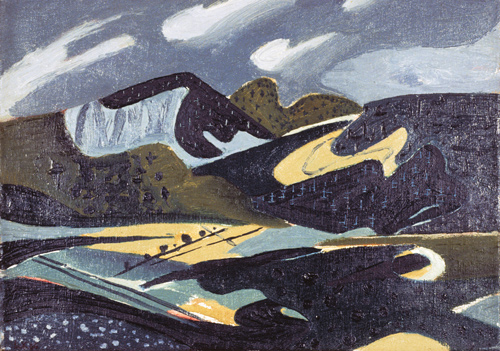
Gray Mountain Landscape

Walter Kröhnke (13 June 1903, Hamburg - 1944, Russia) was a German modernist painter.

== Life and work ==
His father was a chemistry professor. At the age of two, his family relocated to Berlin. From 1922 to 1926, he studied at the Berlin State School of Fine Arts; initially with Ferdinand Spiegel, then with Karl Hofer.

After graduating, he made a study visit to Sanary-sur-Mer, followed by five years in Paris, Italy, and Spain. In 1930, he participated in the Salon d'Automne, under the pseudonym "Nari". He returned to Germany in 1932. A year later, he married the painter, Louise Rösler. Their daughter, Anka, also became a painter.

During the early years of the Nazi régime, he tried to make a living as a photographer. Later, he painted portraits. In 1936, he had a brief solo exhibition at the Galerie Feldhäusser und Fritze in Berlin, but the gallery was closed soon after.

He was drafted into the Wehrmacht in 1939, and took part in Operation Weserübung. Until the end of 1943, he was stationed in Norway. He was then transferred to the Eastern Front, in Russia. He was officially declared to be "missing in action" in 1944.

His studio in Berlin was destroyed during a bombing raid in 1943, and most of his works were lost. Only those works that had previously been sold or loaned out on display were preserved. Some of those works were exhibited in 1949, at the Frankfurter Kunstkabinett, founded by Hanna Bekker vom Rath to honor artists who had been persecuted by the Nazis. The following year, a joint exhibition of his works and those of his wife, Louise, was held at the Kunsthalle Düsseldorf.

A few of his works may be seen at the Kunstmuseum Düsseldorf, the Museum Ludwig, the Von der Heydt-Museum, and the Museum Atelierhaus Rösler-Kröhnke, established in 2004 in Kühlungsborn.

== Sources ==
- Biographical timeline and paintings @ the Museum Atelierhaus Rösler-Kröhnke
- Désirée Gudmundsson and Uwe Haupenthal: Walter Kröhnke 1903 - 1944. Retrospektive, from a catalog of museums in Schleswig-Holstein, Richard-Haizmann-Museum, Niebüll, 1995
- Helmut R. Leppien: Eine Künstlerfamilie – drei Generationen: Waldemar Rösler, Oda Hardt-Rösler, Walter Kröhnke, Louise Rösler, Anka Kröhnke, exhibition catalog, BATIG Gesellschaft für Beteiligungen, Hamburg, 1988
