= Paul Bekker =

German music critic (1882–1937)

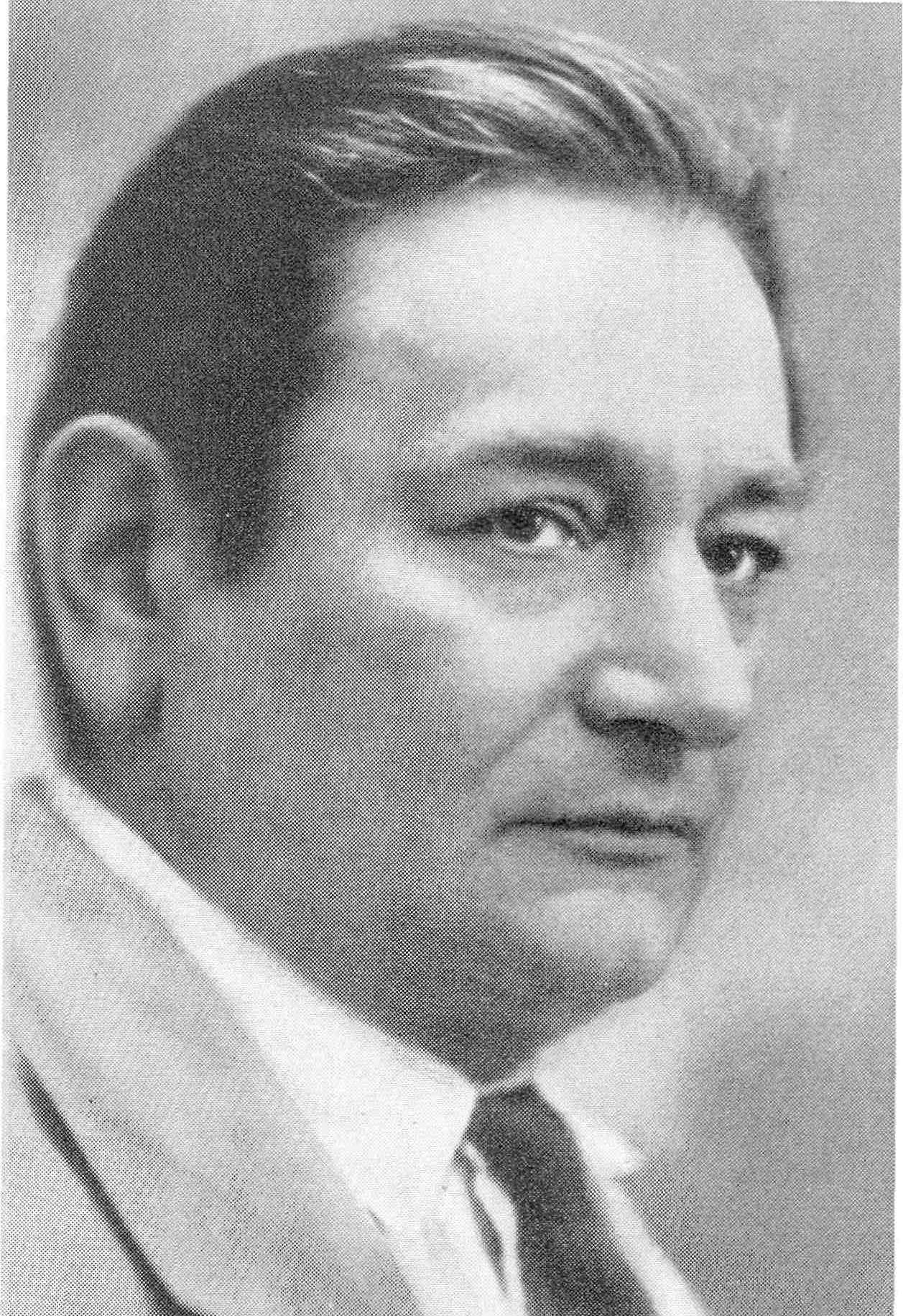
- Bekker c. 1925–27
- Born: 11 September 1882
- Died: 7 April 1937 (aged 54)
- Occupations: Music critic; author
- Notable credits: Frankfurter Zeitung; New Yorker Staats-Zeitung

Max Paul Eugen Bekker (11 September 1882 – 7 March 1937) was a German music critic and author. Described as having "brilliant style and […] extensive theoretical and practical knowledge," Bekker was chief music critic for both the Frankfurter Zeitung (1911–1923), and later the New Yorker Staats-Zeitung (1934–1937).

== Life and career ==
Max Paul Eugen Bekker was born in Berlin on 11 September 1882 as the only child of Hirsch Nachmann Michel Bekker and Olga Elsner. He studied piano with Alfred Sormann, theory with Benno Horwitz, and violin with Fabian Rehfeld. He began his career as a violinist in the Berlin Philharmonic, before employment as a conductor between 1902 and 1905. He ceased playing violin professionally in 1906, although continued to give lessons privately.

After Bekker stopped professional performance he began music criticism, publishing monographs on Oskar Fried (1906/7) and Jacques Offenbach (1909), as well as a successful book on Beethoven in 1911. The work on Beethoven brought him to national prominence and earned him a position at the Frankfurter Zeitung.

In 1916 he published Das deutsche Musikleben, considered by Carl Dahlhaus to be a seminal work in music sociology. Two concepts introduced in that work are the idea of "form" and of music as a "socially formative force" (gesellschaftbildende Kraft). In his 1918 work Die Sinfonie von Beethoven bis Mahler, Bekker developed the idea that symphony had a "community-building force" (gemeinschaftbildende Kraft). This concept was influential in Russia via Boris Asafyev, and was drawn on by Theodor Adorno in his essay "Radio Physiognomics".

Bekker fled Germany for Paris after Hitler's rise to power, and emigrated to New York in 1934, becoming chief music critic of the New Yorker Staats-Zeitung. He died in New York on 7 March 1937.

Bekker married three times: to Dora Zelle between 1909 and 1920, to Hanna vom Rath between 1920 and 1930, and to Margit Reinhard from 1935 until his death. He had one child with Zelle and three with Rath.

The music library of Yale University houses the Paul Bekker Collection, which contains Bekker's correspondence, documents, photographs, printed scores, and manuscripts, given to Yale by the wife of Bekker's eldest son, Konrad.

== See also ==
- Neue Musik
