= Ludwig Knaus =

German painter (1829–1910)

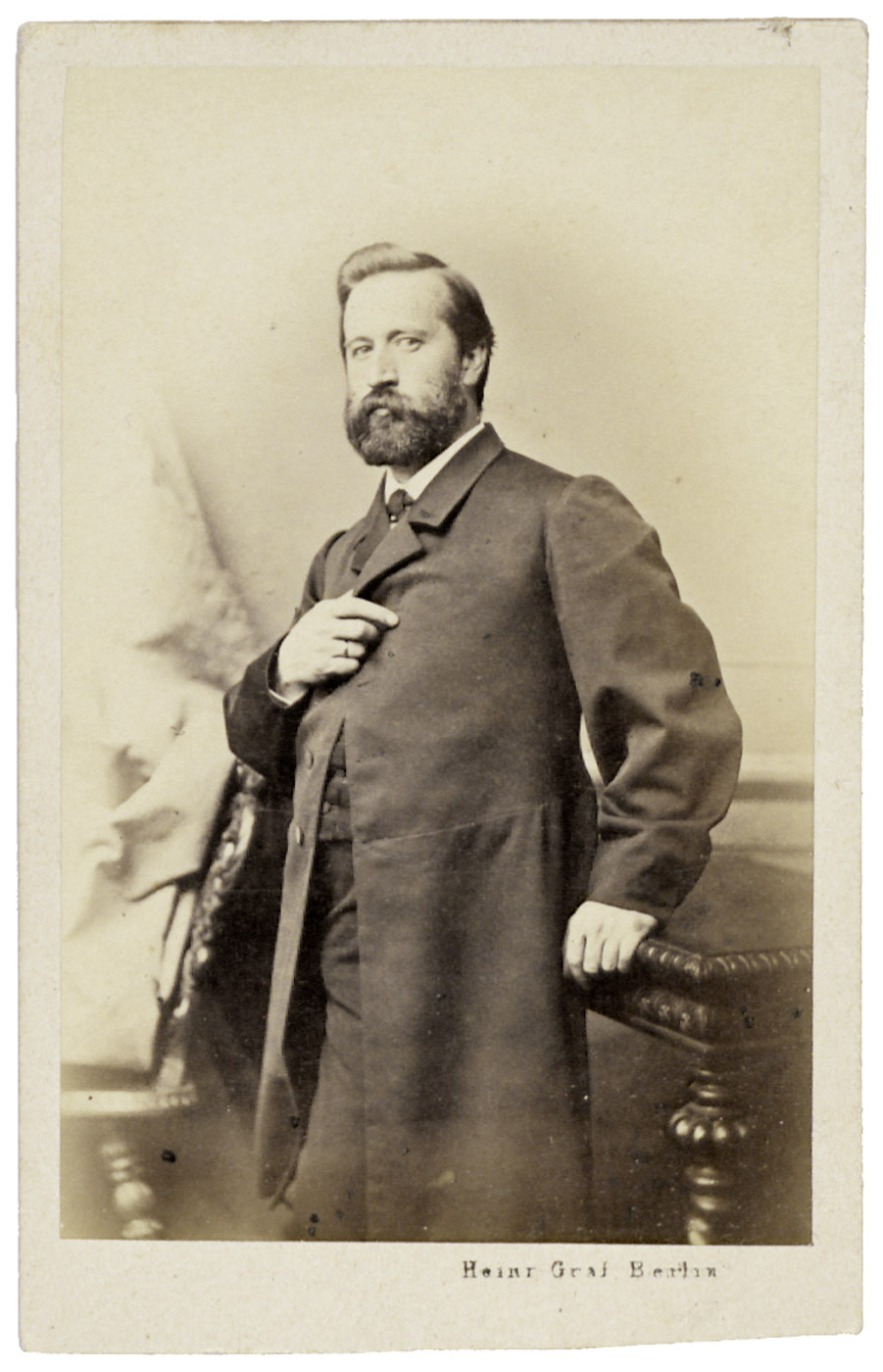
Ludwig Knaus, 1860s

Ludwig Knaus (5 October 1829 – 7 December 1910) was a German genre painter of the younger 7 Düsseldorf school of painting.

== Biography ==
He was born at Wiesbaden and studied from 1845 to 1852 under Sohn and Schadow in Düsseldorf. His early works, like The Gamblers in the Düsseldorf Gallery, are in the manner of that school, being dark and heavy in color. This deficiency was remedied by study at Paris, whither he went in 1852 and enrolled as a pupil of Thomas Couture. In 1853 his Morning after the Kermess received the second gold Medal of the Salon and made him a celebrated painter. Except for a year's study in Italy he remained in Paris until 1860.

His chief works of this period include The Golden Wedding, The Baptism, and The Promenade, purchased for the Luxembourg. From 1861 to 1866 he practiced at Berlin, producing such works as Boys Playing Cards, Looking for a Bride (Wiesbaden Museum), and His Highness on His Travels. The next eight years of his life saw the production of much of his best work, including The Children's Festival (Nation Gallery, Berlin), In Great Distress, and The Village Prince. From 1874 to 1883 he was professor at the Royal Prussian Academy, Berlin, continuing to reside in that city until his death.

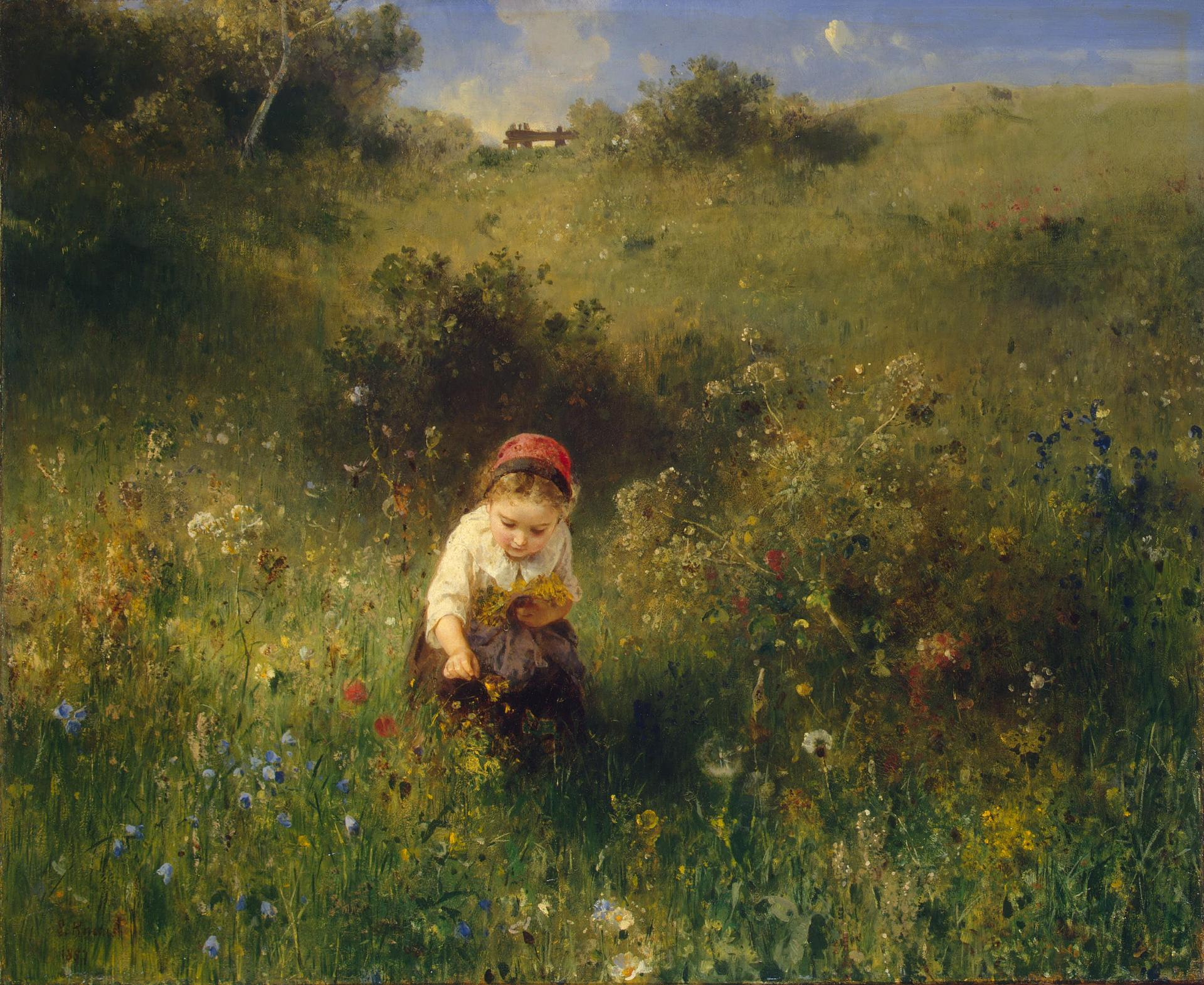
Girl in a Field (1857)

Among the most important works of his last period were: The Holy Family and The Road to Ruin, both painted in 1876 and now in the Metropolitan Museum of Art, New York; Behind the Curtain (1880), Dresden Gallery; The Rag Baby (1880) and A Village Festival (1881), both in the Vanderbilt collection, Metropolitan Museum, New York; and A Duel. During his last period Knaus also painted a series of “Idyls,” with nudes in a rather classical style, of which an important example is in the Wiesbaden Museum.

The most famous examples of his portraits, which are genre in character, are those of the scientist Helmholtz and the historian Mommsen, both in the National Gallery, Berlin. Among his many distinctions were the great gold medal of the Berlin Exhibition of 1861 and the grand medal of honor at the Paris Exposition of 1867. Many of his works are represented at the Museum Wiesbaden.

He was a member of the Berlin, Munich, and many other academies; an Officer of the Legion of Honor and a Knight of the Prussian Order Pour le Mérite. Possibly, his most famous work is Girl in a Field (1857). Engravings of his works were especially popular among the German peasantry.
