= Guido Sandberger =

German paleontologist and geologist (1821-1879)

Guido Sandberger (29 May 1821 in Dillenburg – 22 January 1879 in Bonn) was a German paleontologist and geologist. He was the brother of paleontologist Fridolin von Sandberger.

From 1839 he studied natural sciences at the universities of Heidelberg, Marburg, Bonn and Berlin, and after graduation taught classes at the gymnasium in Wiesbaden. From 1847 onward, he was a teacher at the Realgymnasium (grammar school) in Wiesbaden, where in 1853 he was appointed deputy headmaster.

The palaeontological collection of the Sandberger brothers is presently located in the Museum Wiesbaden.

== Published works ==
With Fridolin von Sandberger, he published "Die Versteinerungen des rheinischen Schichtensystems in Nassau" ("Fossils of the Rhenish strata in Nassau", 1850–56). His other noteworthy written efforts are:

- Die erste Epoche der Entwickelungs-geschichte des Erdkörpers, 1845 – The first epoch of the history of development of the Earth.
- Beobachtungen über mehrer schwierigere Puncte der Organisation der Goniatiten, 1851 – Observations on several difficult points in organizing goniatites.
- Uebersicht der naturhistorischen Beschaffenheit des Herzogthums Nassau, 1857 – Survey on the natural history of the Duchy of Nassau.
- Kurze Betrachtungen über Sipho und Siphonaldute sowie uber Eizelle und andere äussere und innere Merkmale der Schale des gemeinen Schiffsbootes (Nautilus pompilius Linné), 1859 – Brief reflections on Sipho and the siphonal canal.
- Kurzer abriss der allgemeinen geologie. Ein übersichtlicher leitfaden für schüler und freunde der wissenschaft, 1861 – Short outline of general geology.
