= Sipho =

Former genus of gastropods

Sipho is a deprecated former genus of sea snails, marine gastropod mollusks in the family Buccinidae, the true whelks.

The name of the genus Sipho Mörch, 1852 [ex Klein] has become invalid and is a synonym of Colus Röding, 1798. A previous use of the genus name Sipho T. Brown, 1827 is now a synonym of Puncturella

All the species that used to belong to the genus Sipho have become synonyms of other species in the family Buccinidae.
