= Adolf Sandberger =

German musicologist and composer

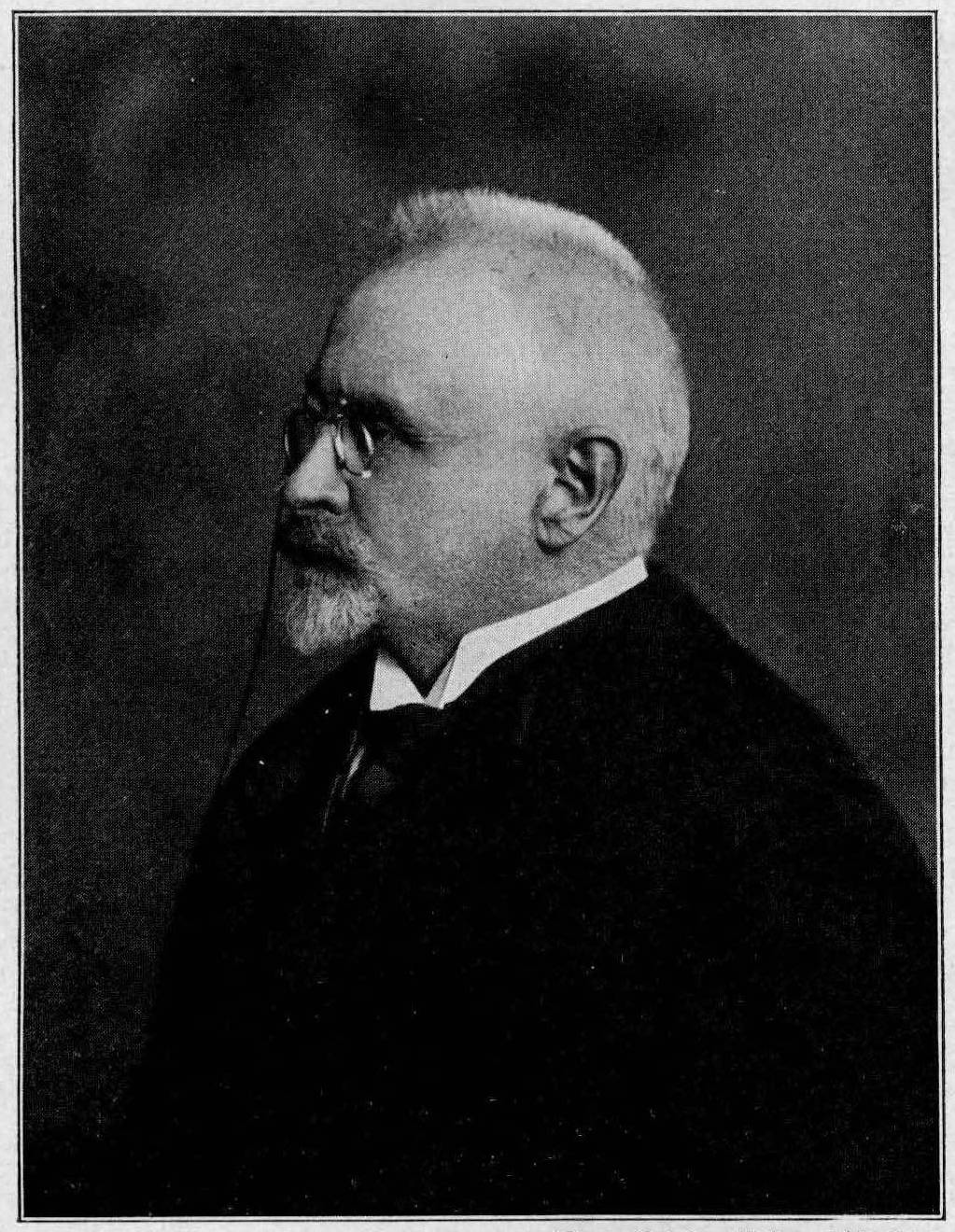
Adolf

Adolf Wilhelm August Sandberger (19 December 1864 in Würzburg – 14 January 1943 in Munich) was a German musicologist and composer, with a particular interest in 16th-century music. He founded the School of Musicology at the Ludwig-Maximilians-Universität München, where he worked as a professor of musicology from 1904 to his retirement in 1930. In addition to his academic work, Sandberger composed two operas, several choruses and some chamber and instrumental music. His Violin Sonata, Op, 10 (1892) was dedicated to Benno Walter.

He was the son of Karl Ludwig Fridolin von Sandberger.
