= Emy Roeder =

German sculptor

- Born: January 30, 1890; Würzburg, German Empire
- Died: February 7, 1971 (aged 81); Mainz, West Germany
- Known for: Sculpture
- Spouse: Herbert Gabe

Emy Roeder (30 January 1890 – 7 February 1971) was a modern German sculptor born in Würzburg, Germany. During the first third of the twentieth century she was one of a number of women that were associated with the German Expressionist movement of Modern art. She was the first woman to achieve Master Student of sculpture as a student at the Berlin Academy In 1937 her work was labeled Degenerate art by the Nazis. After World War II she was arrested in Italy by the Allies because she was a German citizen and then sent to an internment camp. She received the Villa Romana prize in 1936, and was awarded the Federal Cross of Merit for her life work in 1960. She died, aged 81, in Mainz.

== Biography ==
In her late teens from 1908 to 1910 she began to study both drawing and sculpture which led her to further her studies and attend Kunstakademie in Munich, Germany. She attended for two years, but found her experience to be a “disappointment”. It was in 1912 that she moved to Darmstadt to study under famous Expressionist sculptor Bernhard Hoetger. Unlike the prior, this experience she found “enriching”. There is no doubt that Roeder's work was greatly influenced by both the ideas and style of Hoetger. After following him around on many of his endeavors she thirsted for greater stimulation and eventually decided to move by herself to Berlin around 1915. Here she met a great community of fellow artists including “Käthe Kollwitz, Erich Heckel, Karl Schmidt-Rotluff, and sculptor Herbert Garbe” who she soon married in 1920.

It was after a productive self-exile that she found her own individuality and artistic vision. During this time alone she was able to closely observe peasant life which became very important in her later work where she romanticized peasant women and found nobility within their challenging lives. It is sad to say that most of her artwork from the teens and twenties remains little known as it has either been lost, destroyed by Nazis, or was victim of the devastation of the World Wars. Thankfully her later works have been preserved in a handful of German museums, including Städtische Galerie in her hometown Würzburg, Germany. After her return from exile she moved back to Berlin during a time of extreme political upheavals and violence. Roeder was one of many that believed art could serve Utopian goals which lead her to join the Novembergruppe (November Group). This group of artists put their artwork up to serve the socialist society however this goal quickly became short lived when the focus became more about the promotion of member's exhibitions and less about political activism.

Roeder's work tended to be small in scale and explored a variety of themes including female sexuality, pregnancy, and motherhood. Many of her early works also embraced traditional Christian themes. She ended up moving to Oberammergau, Germany to study woodcarving which then allowed her to create Creche Relief, which was one of the few works of hers that actually survived the war. It is also important to note that this piece, one of her most Expressionist pieces, is the only known work of Roeder's in a North American Collection, The Robert Gore Rifkind Collection in Beverly Hills, California.

Roeder's work moved back into a state of invoking political change as she strayed from Expressionism and began to take on a new realism also known as Die neue Sachlichkeit (The New Objectivity). She became involved in various organizations, exhibitions, and activities that drew attention to women artists and the improvement of social conditions for women. Two important exhibitions at this time that she participated in were “Die schaffende Frau in der bildende Kunst” (The Creative Woman in the Visual Arts) and “Frauen in Not” (Women in Need). For three years in the late 1920s she maintained membership in the Verein der Berliner Künstlerinnen (Association of Berlin Women Artists) which had been founded in 1867.

Roeder's reputation continued to develop throughout the 1930s. This development was solidified when two of her works were represented in the 1934 survey of 20th-century German sculpture by Alfred Hentzen. Further assurance came in 1936 as she was awarded the Villa-Romana Prize, a one-year scholarship at the Villa Romana in Florence. Receiving this award allowed her to work and study as she owned a studio in the Villa Romana, a German art institute located in Florence that was privately funded. It was in 1937 that she left for Italy in order to “sacrifice her marriage to a solitary existence, full of work and renunciation”.

Despite being away from Germany and the great turmoil there, the impact was still felt as the Nazis came to power and began a battle against all forms of Modern art including Expressionism. This led to the public denouncement of Roeder's work in 1937 as her sculpture Pregnant Woman was confiscated by the Nazis and included in the famous exhibition “Entartete Kunst” (Degenerate Art) located in Munich, Germany. The designation of Degenerate by the Nazis banned her from exhibiting her work in Germany. Later in 1944 while Florence was occupied by the Allied forces she was identified as an enemy alien and therefore was arrested and sent to an internment camp in Padula. Here she oversaw the women's bath house, lucky for her she was given the freedom to draw resulting in many sketches of the inmates and their physical movement within the showers. After her release she went back to Rome where she created a series of bronze relief sculptures using the sketches she had made inside the Padula camp. In 1949 her application for Italian citizenship was denied and Roeder returned to Germany. Here she taught in the Landeskunstschule and became renewed by a vast amount of recognition in her homeland with many exhibitions, prizes, and medals. Including her participation in the first documenta exhibition in Kassel in 1955 After years of imprisonment and neglect she was finally able to revitalize her creativity one last time before her death on February 7, 1971.

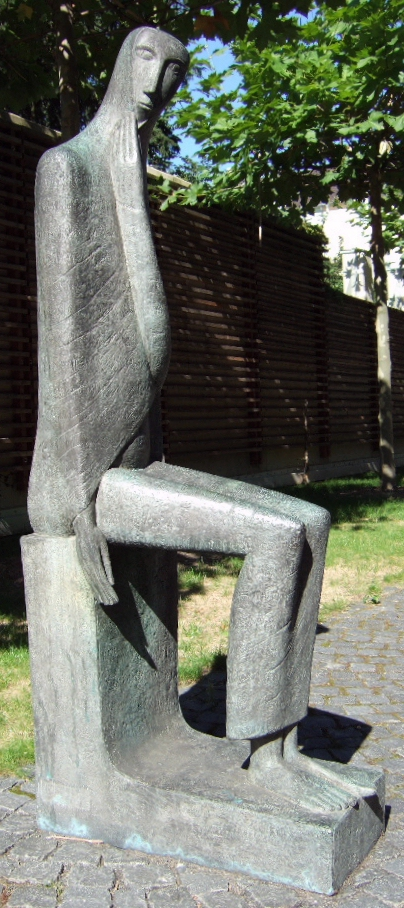
Tripoli III (1963), Rheinisches Landesmuseum, Bonn

== Principal works ==
- 1914 – Bust of a Girl, artificial stone, destroyed.
- 1918 – Portrait of Herbert Garbe, artificial stone, destroyed.
- 1919 – Pregnant Woman, terracotta, location unknown.
- 1920 – Family, destroyed.
- 1920 – Creche Relief, wood, Courtesy The Robert Gore Rifkind Collection, Beverly Hills, California.
- 1939 – Bather, terracotta, destroyed.
- 1946 – Padula I, bronze relief, Courtesy Städtische Galerie, Würzburg.
- 1964 – Self-Portrait, bronze, Courtesy Städtische Galerie, Würzburg.
