= Max Ackermann =

German artist

Max Ackermann (5 October 1887 – 14 November 1975) was a German painter and graphic artist of abstract works and representational art.

== Life and work ==
Born in Berlin on 5 October 1887, Ackermann started carving wooden figures and modelling ornaments in his father's studio at an early age. From 1905 to 1907 he studied under Henry van de Velde at his studio in Weimar and at Gotthardt Kuehl's studio in Dresden (1908–09). From 1909 to 1910, he furthered his studies in Franz von Stuck's class at the Munich Art Academy. In 1912, aged 25, he attended the State Academy of Fine Arts in Stuttgart, where he worked as an apprentice of Adolf Hölzel, who "introduced Ackermann to non-representational painting and turned out to have a formative influence on his future works", and he began to paint abstractly.

Ackermann joined the Landsturm in the First World War, where he was wounded and discharged following a lengthy period in hospital, after which from 1918 to 1919 he was a member of Der Blaue Reiter, ('the Blue Rider'). In 1921 the artist met pioneer of abstract dance Rudolf von Laban, "with whom he entered into a vivid discussion about dance notation and counterpoint, inspiring Ackermann to rhythmic blind paintings". Throughout the 1920s he worked as an artist in Stuttgart, where his first one-man show was held in 1924, featuring figurative and abstract paintings, pastels and drawings at the Württembergische art association. In 1926 he spent time in Paris, where he became friends with Piet Mondrian and Adolf Loos. Around this time, Wassily Kandinsky "confirmed and encouraged him in his quest for the absolute painting". In 1928 he shared a collective show at Stuttgart's Schaller Gallery with Kandinsky and George Grosz.

He set up a Lehrwerkstätte für Neue Kunst ('Training workshop for New Art') in his studio and hosted holiday seminars for young art teachers. In 1930 Ackermann introduced a seminar on 'absolute painting' at the Stuttgart Volkshochschule. Based on these seminar topics, in 1933 he gave lectures at a Hölzel exhibition in Stuttgart's Valentien gallery. Ackermann was considered degenerate by the new Nazi authorities, and in 1933 he was forbidden from exhibiting by decree, and in 1936, again by decree, he was forbidden from teaching. He also suffered the official confiscation of graphics and paintings displayed in the Württembergische state gallery in Stuttgart. After being banned from teaching, Ackermann continued his abstract work at Hornstaad on Lake Constance, which became an artists' colony joined by Otto Dix, Erich Heckel and Helmuth Macke.

Many of his early works were lost when his studio was destroyed in a Second World War air raid. After the war, a 1946 one-man show in Stuttgart was followed by other solo shows in West German cities and collective shows at the Salon des Réalités Nouvelles in Paris and the 1949 Zurich exhibition Kunst in Deutschland 1930-49. With Wolfgang Fortner, Ackermann held a seminar on music and painting in 1952. A year later, he took part in an event with Hugo Häring and Kurt Leonhart on the subject of painting and architecture. In 1956, as successor to Willi Baumeister, who had died, the Künstlerbund Baden-Württemberg artists' association appointed Ackermann to the Rat der Zehn ('Council of Ten'). The state of Baden-Württemberg awarded Ackermann the honorary title of Professor in 1957, and in 1964 he was honoured by the West German Academy. To mark his 80th birthday in 1967, one-man shows were held at the Mittelrhein Museum in Koblenz and other galleries in Kaiserslautern, Friedrichshafen and Lake Constance. A 1967 retrospective exhibition took his work from 1908 on to Koblenz, Kaiserslautern, Constance, Wolfsburg and Cologne, and the University of Chicago in 1969.

Twice married, to Gertrude Ostermayer from 1936 to 1957 and to Johanna Strathomeyer in 1974, Ackermann died in Unterlengenhardt, Bad Liebenzell in the Black Forest on 14 November 1975, aged 88.

In 2018 Ackermann's works were presented in a solo exhibition in the german gallery Bode in Daegu (South Korea) for the very first time in the East Asian region.

== Selected works ==
- 1927: Deutschland, 95 × 62,3 cm
- 1930: Gegenstandslose Komposition, 155 × 111 cm
- 1931: Mädchen mit Hund
- 1932: Konkretes, 100 × 109
- c. 1945: Herabkunft der Musik, 46 x 32 cm
- 1954: Überbrückte Kontinente, 120 × 50 cm
- c. 1955: An die Freude
- 1957: Ohne Titel (Bajamar), 50 × 65 cm
- 1962: Komposition, 185 × 130 cm
- 1951: Der Feuerball, 205 × 80 cm

== Exhibitions ==
- 2018: Max Ackermann: Musik im Bild/ Music inside the painting, Galerie & Edition Bode, Nuremberg, Germany and Daegu, South Korea.

== Publications ==
- Dirk Blübaum (edit.): Max Ackermann (1887–1975) - Die Suche nach dem Ganzen, Exhib. Cat., Zeppelin Museum, Friedrichshafen, 2004.
- Lutz Tittel: Max Ackermann 1887 - 1975. Zum 100. Geburtstag. Stuttgart, 1987.
- Klaus D. Bode (edit.): Max Ackermann. Music inside the picture. Bode Galerie & Edition, Daegu 2018, ISBN 978-3-943800-20-3.

== See also ==
- List of German painters
