= Karl Ludwig Fridolin von Sandberger =

German palaeontologist and geologist (1826–1898)

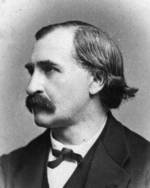
- Karl Ludwig Fridolin von Sandberger
- Born: November 22, 1826; Dillenburg, Nassau
- Died: April 12, 1898 (aged 71); Würzburg, German Empire
- Scientific career
- Fields: Paleontology

Karl Ludwig Fridolin von Sandberger (22 November 1826 – 12 April 1898), German palaeontologist and geologist, was born at Dillenburg, Nassau, on 22 November 1826. He was educated at the universities of Bonn, Heidelberg and Giessen, at the last of which he graduated Ph.D. in 1846. He then studied at the University of Marburg, where he wrote his first essay, Übersicht der geologischen Verhältnisse des Herzogtums Nassau (1847).

In 1849 he became curator of the Natural History Museum at Wiesbaden, and began to study the Tertiary strata of the Mayence Basin, and also the Devonian fossils of the Rhenish provinces, on which he published elaborate memoirs. In 1855 he was appointed professor of mineralogy and geology at the Polytechnic Institute at Karlsruhe, and he took part in the geological survey of Baden. From 1863 to 1896 he was professor of mineralogy and geology at the University of Würzburg. In 1866, he was elected as a member to the American Philosophical Society. His great work Die Land- und Süsswasser-Conchylien der Vorwelt was published in 1870–1875. Later he issued an authoritative 2-volume work on mineral veins, Untersuchungen über Erzgänge (1882–1885). He died at Würzburg on 11 April 1898. His brother Guido Sandberger (1821–1869) was an authority on fossil cephalopoda, and together they published Die Versteinerungen des rheinischen Schichtensystems in Nassau (1850–1856). Adolf Sandberger, Fridolin's son, was a noted German musicologist and composer.

Fridolin Sandberger is credited with the first valid description of Laxitextella laxitexta, which is an extinct clam shrimp species named by him Estheria laxitexta.
