= Ida Kerkovius =

German painter

Ida Kerkovius (1879–1970) was a Baltic German painter and weaver from Latvia.

== Life ==
Kerkovius was one of twelve children born to an upper-class Baltic German family. She was taught piano at an all-girls secondary school before attending a private institution in Riga. In Riga, she studied at a private schol of art. There she came in contact with a student of Adolf Hölzel and grew to have an acute understanding of paint and colour. So she applied at art school von Adolf Hölzel, the Dachauer Malschule, in the nearby village of Dachau. There she soon became his master student, who then trained new students in Hölzel's teachings - e.g. also Johannes Itten and Willi Baumeister.

She became an assistant and theorist at the Königlich Württembergische Akademie der Bildenden Künste in Stuttgart (the Royal Academy of the Arts in the Kingdom of Württemberg) where she went together with Hölzel before losing her citizenship, and thus her place at the academy, during World War I. Kerkovius then taught foreign students in similar positions and registered at the Bauhaus between 1920 and 1923, where she eventually joined the weaving workshop. Her income between the wars came primarily from the weaving workshop and through the secret sale of Kerkovius’s art by art dealer Hanna Bekker vom Rath. Her studio in Stuttgart was bombed during World War II, destroying many of her existing paintings. After World War II she undertook numerous journeys, especially to Italy, where wonderful pictures were taken. The number of national and international exhibitions grew significantly and many of her works can now be found in well-known museums. Especially the big retrospective 2001 in Regensburg and Riga. her hometown, which was also the European Capital of Culture at the time and was celebrating its 800th anniversary, should be highlighted here She received more and more honors. In 1954 she was awarded the Federal Cross of Merit by Federal President Theodor Heuss. In 1955 Ida Kerkovius received first prize in the exhibition "Ischia in the Pictures of German Painters". In 1958 she was awarded the title of professor by the federal state of Baden-Württemberg. She was later named a member of the artists’ guild of Esslingen am Neckar and was awarded first prize for work in the 1955 exhibition Ischia im Bilde deutscher Maler.

== Exhibitions ==
=== Solo exhibitions ===
- Leopold-Hoesch Museum, Düren, Germany, 1929
- Württembergischer Kunstverein, Stuttgart, Germany, 1930
- Galerie Valentien, Stuttgart, Germany, 1933
- Württembergischer Kunstverein, Stuttgart, Germany, 1948
- Württembergischer Kunstverein, Stuttgart, Germany, 1954
- Galerie Günther Franke, Munich, Germany, 1958
- Württembergischer Kunstverein, Stuttgart, Germany, 1959
- Museum am Ostwall, Dortmund, Germany, 1961
- Galerie Maerchklin, Stuttgart, Germany, 1962
- Galerie Vömel, Düsseldorf, Germany, 1963
- Galerie Günther Franke, Munich, Germany, 1963
- Galerie Valentien, Stuttgart, Germany, 1964
- Nassauischer Kunstverein, Wiesbaden, 1964
- Düsseldorfer Museum, Germany, 1964
- Galerie Maercklin, Stuttgart, Germany, 1964
- Galerie Bremer, Berlin, Germany, 1965
- Kunstnernes, Oslo, Norway, 1966
- Heidelberger Kunstverein, Heidelberg, Germany, 1966
- Galerie Günther Franke, Munich, Germany, 1967
- Württembergischer Kunstverein, Stuttgart, Germany, 1969
- Galerie Maercklin, Stuttgart, Germany, 1969
- Galerie der Stadt, Stuttgart, (retrospective), Germany, 1979
- Galerie Orangerie-Reinz, Cologne, (retrospective), Germany, 1981
- Frankfurter Kunstkabinett, Frankfurt am Main, (retrospective), Germany, 1988
- 1990 Friedrichshafen, Städtisches Bodenseemuseum
- 1998 Böblingen, Ida Kerkovius, (Im Zauber der Farben)
- 1998/9 Hofheim/Ts Stadtmuseum; Mönchengladbach, Städtisches Museum
- Schloss Rheydt; Sondershausen, Schlossmuseum, (Ida Kerkovius, (1879–1970) Teppiche und Entwürfe)
- 2001 Riga, Arzemju Makslas muzejs und Regensburg, Museum Ostdeutsche * Galerie (Retrospektive)
- 2014 Kunstsammlungen Chemnitz, (Meine Welt ist die Farbe[8])
- 2017 Engen, Städtisches Museum, (Ida Kerkovius. Im Herzen der Farbe) [9] Thereafter in Stadtmuseum Hofheim am Taunus.[10][11]
- 2019 Apolda, Kunsthaus (Ida Kerkovius – Eine Künstlerin des Bauhauses)[12]
- 2020 Stuttgart, Staatsgalerie (Ida Kerkovius – Die ganze Welt ist Farbe)[13]

Li

=== Group exhibitions ===
- L'altra metà dell'avanguardia, 1910–1940, Palazzo Reale, Milan, Italy, 1980
- Das Verborgene Museum I, Akademie der Künste, Berlin, Germany, 1987
- Frauen im Aufbruch, Künstlerinnen im deutschen Südwesten 1800–1945, Stadtische Galerie, Germany, 1995
