= Innere Neustadt =

Innere Neustadt may refer to:

- Innere Neustadt (Bern)
- Innere Neustadt (Dresden)
