= Ernst Ferdinand Oehme =

German Romantic painter and illustrator (1797–1855)

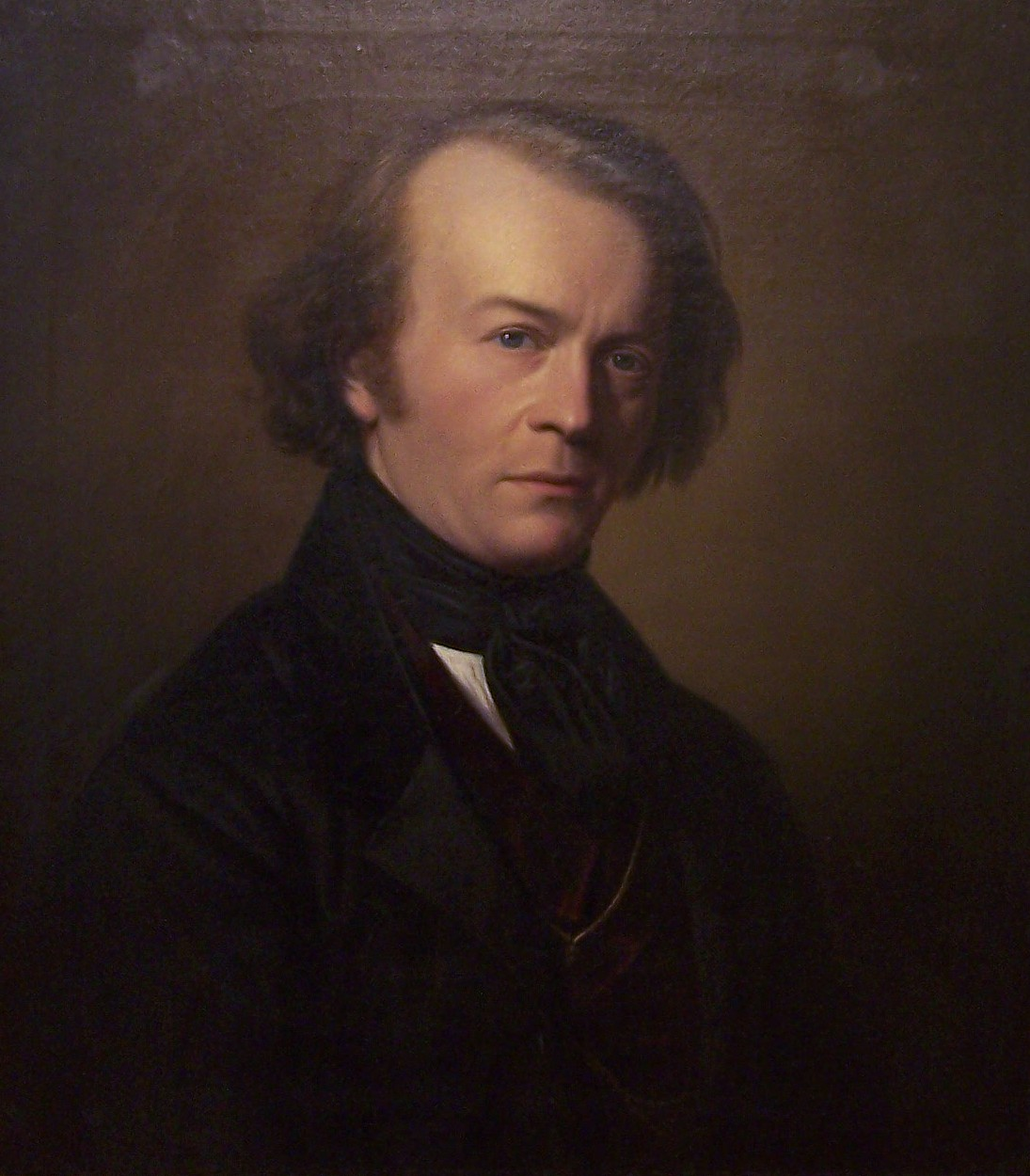
Ernst Ferdinand Oehme; portrait by Johann Karl Bähr

Ernst Ferdinand Oehme (23 April 1797, Dresden – 10 April 1855, Dresden) was a German Romantic painter and illustrator who specialized in moody landscapes with architectural elements.

== Life ==
He originally attended the Friedrichstadt teacher training college and worked as an assistant to a "Torschreiber" (a combination gate keeper and tax collector). After beginning as an auto-didact, with some help from Carl Wagner, he enrolled at the Dresden Academy of Fine Arts in 1819, where he studied with the Danish painter Johan Christian Clausen Dahl, who had recently settled there. He soon became acquainted with the work of Dahl's friend Caspar David Friedrich. Together with August Heinrich, a student of Friedrich's, he became familiar with the surrounding countryside, especially Saxon Switzerland, and practiced what would later become known as plein-air painting. He had his first exhibition at the academy in 1821 with "Cathedral in Winter", a work that shows the influence of Friedrich.

With financial assistance from Crown Prince Friedrich Augustus of Saxony, he was able to continue his studies in Italy, where he gravitated towards the German community and made lifelong friendships with Ludwig Richter, Carl Gottlieb Peschel and Julius Schnorr von Carolsfeld, although the Nazarene movement had little influence on his work. Upon his return in 1825, he took a journey through the Alps, painting watercolors. Back in Dresden, he received orders from Johann Gottlob von Quandt and the Crown Prince, who had him create paintings for a "Galerie vaterländischer Landschaften" (Gallery of Patriotic Landscapes).

By the 1830s, he had begun to break away from his earlier style, painting works that were more realistic and less laden with symbolism. In the 1840s, he found an important patron in retired Major Friedrich Anton Serre, whose home was a significant gathering point for artists, writers and musicians. During this time, he apparently took part in amateur performances at the Societaetstheater. He became a teacher at the Blochmannsche Institute in 1842 and was appointed a court painter in 1846. Shortly thereafter, he was named an honorary member of the academy.

His son, Ernst Erwin, was also a well-known painter.

== Selected paintings ==
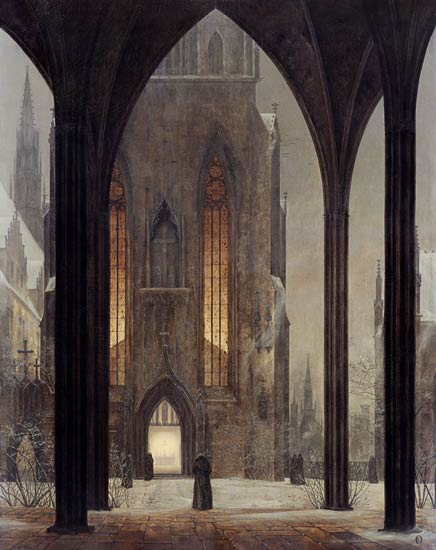
Cathedral in Winter (1821)

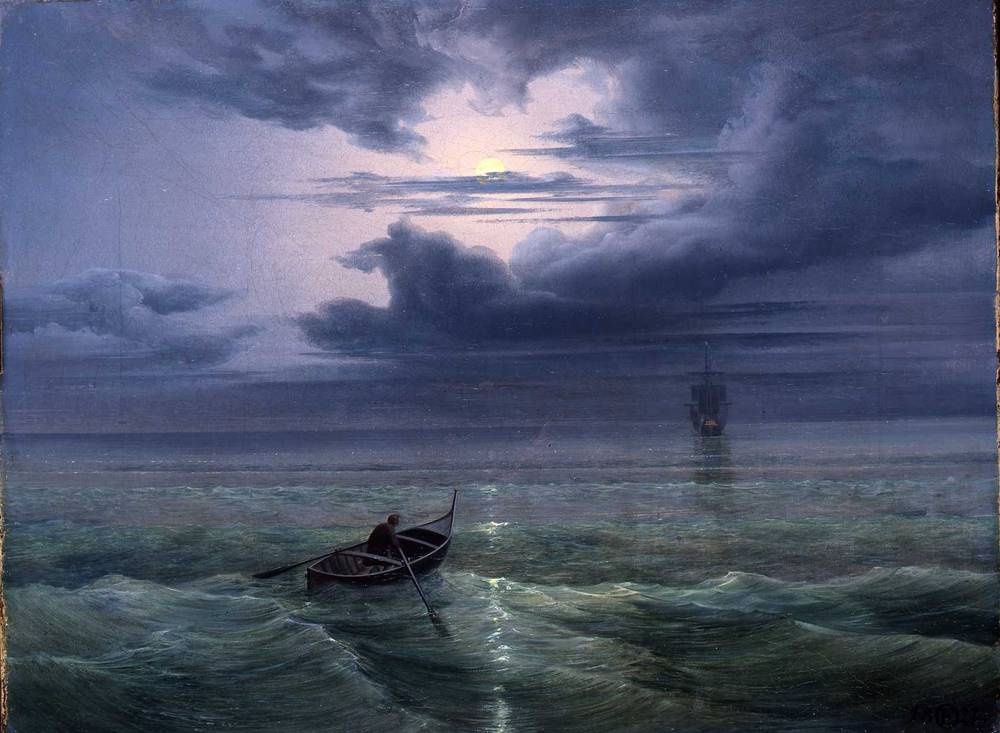
Moonlight on the
Gulf of Salerno (1827)

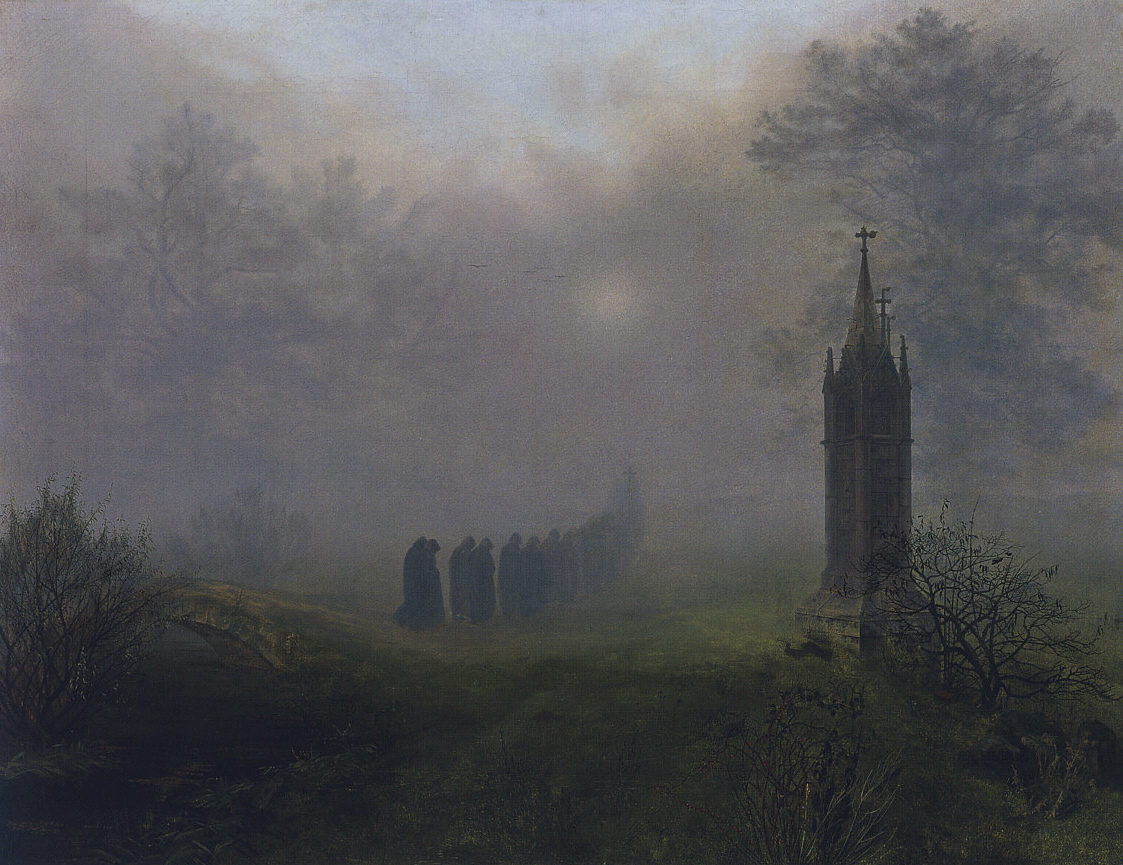
Procession in the Fog (1828)

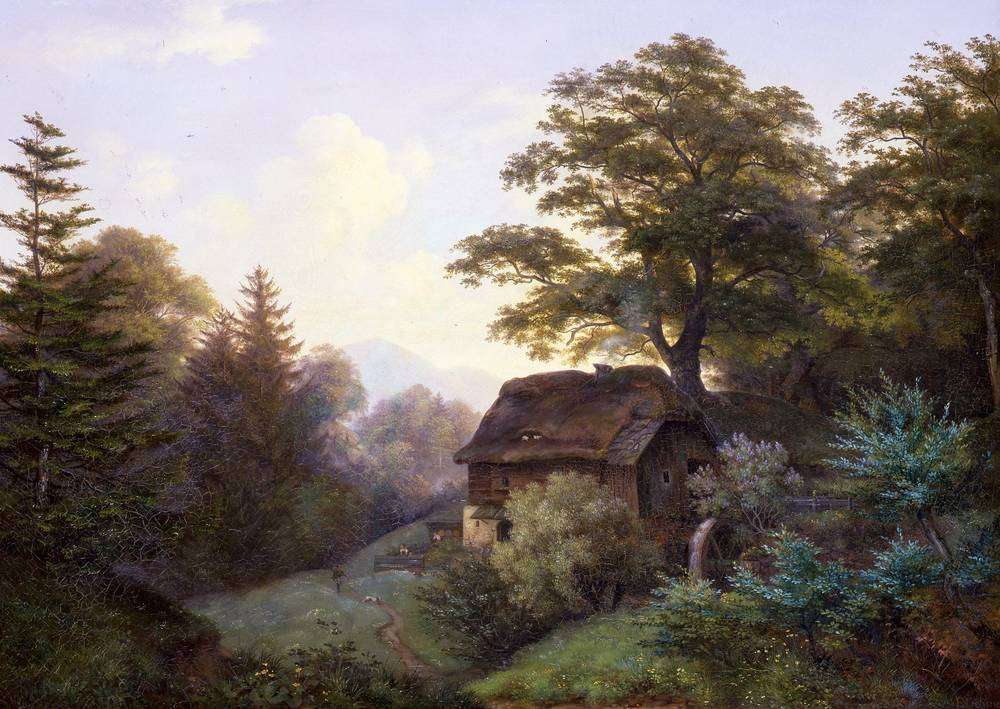
The Watermill (1844)

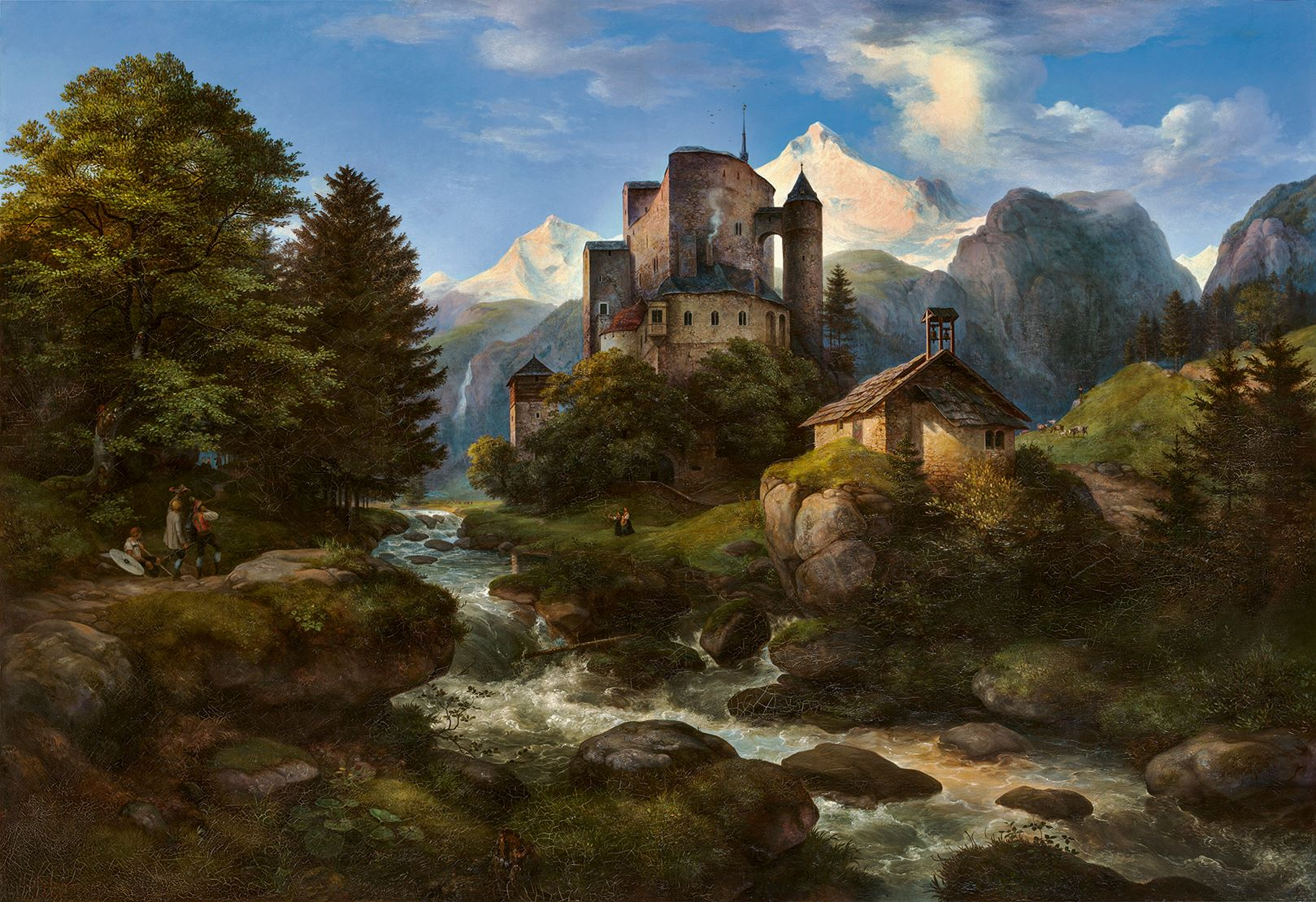
Naudersberg Castle in Tyrol (1847)

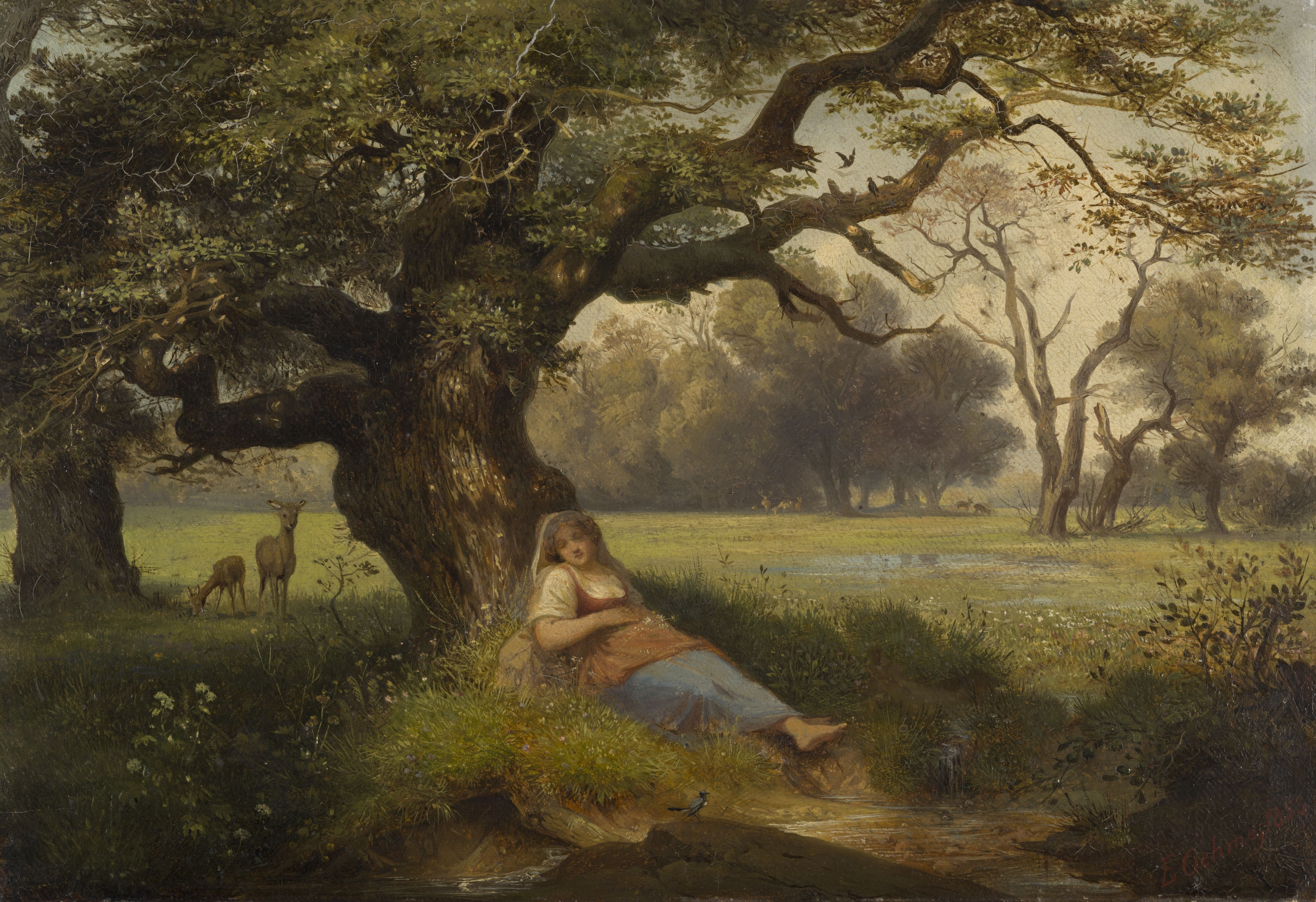
Landscape with Sleeping Girl (1853)
