= Arnold Schaefer =

German historian (1819–1883)

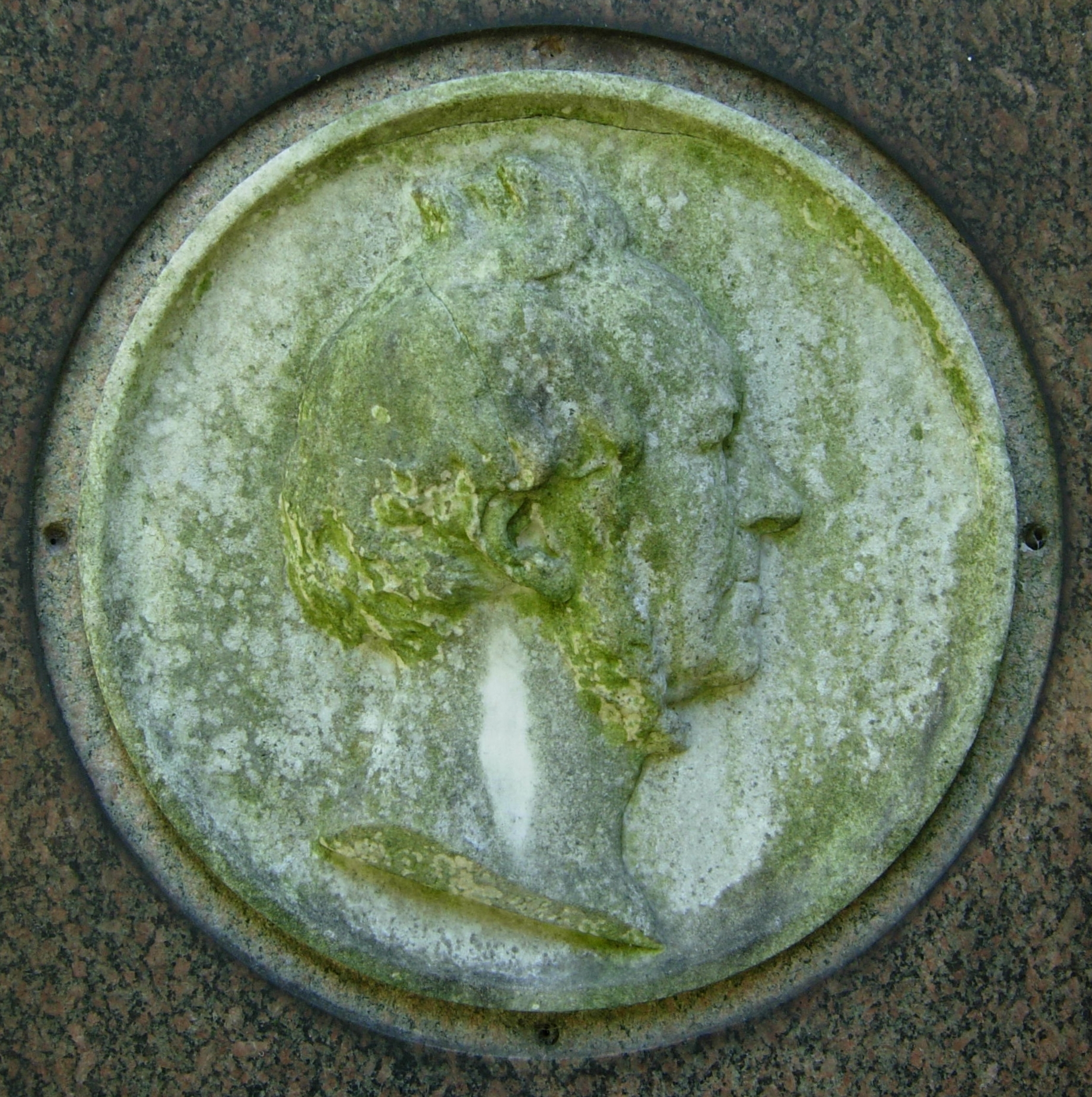
Depiction of Arnold Schaefer on his gravestone in the Alter Friedhof, Bonn, by Albert Küppers

Arnold Dietrich Schaefer (16 October 1819 in Seehausen, today part of Bremen – 19 November 1883 in Bonn) was a German ancient historian, who was a professor of history at the University of Greifswald (1857-1865) and then at the University of Bonn (1865-1883).

== Academic background ==
After attending the Gelehrtenschule Bremen from 1833 to 1838, Schaefer studied philology and history at the University of Leipzig. His teachers included Moritz Haupt (1808–1874), Gottfried Hermann (1772–1848), and Wilhelm Wachsmuth (1784-1866). After his graduation, Schaefer initially attempted a habilitation project on Old High German, supervised by Moritz Haupt. Due to a favourable job offer from the educationalist Karl Justus Blochmann (1786–1855), Schaefer was persuaded to relocate to Dresden, where he subsequently taught classes in history and ancient languages at the Vitzthum Gymnasium. Schaefer was already producing a large number of publications at this time, including the school textbook Commentatio de libro vitarum decem oratorum (Commentary on the Book of the Lives of the Ten Orators, 1844) and Geschichtstabellen zum Auswendiglernen (Historical tables for memorisation, 1847), a practical handbook for students, which contained important dates in world history from antiquity to his day, divided into three sections: general history, epochal history, and cultural history. By 1888 it had been through 17 editions, the last two of which (1885 and 1888) were edited by Schaefer's colleague Julius Asbach.

In 1851, Schaefer was appointed to the Gymnasium St. Augustine in Grimma. There he completed the first two volumes of his three-volume work Demosthenes und seine Zeit (Demosthenes and his Time, 1856-1858), on which he had been working for ten years. His valedictory speech at the school discussed Demosthenes' On the Crown.

On 30 November 1857, Schaefer became an ordinary professor of history at the University of Greifswald. In his lectures and seminars (for the university's history department, which he founded in 1863), Schaefer dealt with all periods and fields of history, but with a focus on Roman history and the modern history of Prussia. He maintained friendly links with colleagues in various fields, including the economist Eduard Baumstark, the archaeologist Adolf Michaelis, and the philologists Martin Hertz, Georg Friedrich Schömann, and Hermann Usener. He refused a post at the University of Königsberg in 1863, to fill the vacancy left by Wilhelm von Giesebrecht's departure.

In the summer of 1865, Schaefer moved to the University of Bonn, where he held the Chair of History until he died in 1883. The faculty of history was established at the same time; before this, all professors of history had been part of the philology faculty. In the academic year 1871/72, Schaefer served as a rector of the university.

In Bonn, Schaefer continued his lectures from Greidswald. Source criticism of Greek and Roman historical texts formed an important part of his lessons, forming the foundations for his publication in 1867 of Abriß der Quellenkunde der griechischen Geschichte bis auf Polybios (Outline of Source Criticism of Greek History up to Polybios). A second volume of the work was published shortly before his death under the title Abriß der Quellenkunde der griechischen und römischen Geschichte (Outline of Source Criticism of Greek and Roman History, 1883). His successor, Heinrich Nissen produced a second edition of this work in 1885, which itself received a second printing in 1867.

The studies of Prussian history which Schaefer had begun in Greifswald intensified in Bonn. He published the Geschichte des siebenjährigen Kriegs (History of the Seven Years' War) in three volumes between 1867 and 1874. The work was praised by the domestic and foreign press for his novel depiction of the operations. Shortly after the publication of the final volume, Schaefer undertook an extended educational tour of Greece, Asia Minor, Syria, and Italy. In 1879, he visited Rome for the celebrations of the fiftieth anniversary of the German Archaeological Institute there, and in 1880 he visited the Peloponnese, spending a great deal of time in Olympia. On the return journey, he was struck by a severe bout of rheumatism, from which he recovered by a trip to a health spa. A few weeks after his return from the health spa, on 19 November 1883, Schaefer unexpectedly died at work from a stroke. His grave is in the Alter Friedhof.

In his final years, Schaefer had been working on a new edition of his work on Demosthenes, to take account of the numerous papyrus finds and textual emendations that had occurred in the thirty years since the publication of the original work. The work was completed by Max Hoffmann and it appeared in three volumes, shortly after his death (1885-1887).

In 1894, Schaefer's widow, Eugenie Schaefer née Großmann (daughter of the theologian Christian Gottlob Großmann) donated 100,000 marks to found the "Arnold-Schäfer-Fund" to support students and young scholars at the University of Bonn, which is still active today.

== Selected works ==
Largely known for his writings on ancient Greek and Roman history, Schaefer also made contributions to studies involving the history of Prussia. The following are a few of his principal works:

- Geschichtstabellen zum Auswendiglernen (1847) - Historical Tables for Memorization (Online)
- Demosthenes und seine Zeit (1856–58) - Demosthenes and his Times.
- De ephoris Lacedaemoniis (1863) - On the Spartan ephors
- Disputatio de rerum post bellum Persicum usque ad tricennale foedus in Graecia gestarum temporibus (1865) - Computation of the Dates of Events in Greece from the Persian War until the Thirty Years' Peace
- Abriß der Quellenkunde der griechischen Geschichte bis auf Polybios (1867) - Outline of Source Criticism of Greek History up to Polybios.
- Geschichte des siebenjährigen Kriegs (1867–74), three volumes - History of the Seven Years' War.
- Abriß der Quellenkunde der griechischen und römischen Geschichte (1883) - Outline of Source Criticism of Greek and Roman History.
