= Ulrich Wilcken =

German historian (1862–1944)

Ulrich Wilcken (December 18, 1862 – December 10, 1944) was a German historian and papyrologist who was a native of Stettin.

== Biography ==
Wilcken studied ancient history and Oriental studies at Leipzig University, the University of Tübingen and the Friedrich Wilhelm University of Berlin. He was a disciple of historian Theodor Mommsen (1817–1903), who encouraged Wilcken to take a position as cataloguer of papyri following graduation. Mommsen was also instrumental in Wilcken succeeding Eduard Meyer (1855–1930) as associate professor of ancient history at the University of Breslau in 1889. Thereafter, he was a professor at the University of Würzburg (from 1900), the University of Halle (from 1903, where he was again a successor to Eduard Meyer), Leipzig University (from 1906) and the University of Bonn (from 1912), where he succeeded Heinrich Nissen (1839–1912). Later on, he served as a professor at the Ludwig-Maximilians-Universität München (from 1915) and the Friedrich Wilhelm University of Berlin (from 1917), where he was successor to Otto Hirschfeld (1843–1922).

Wilcken was a German pioneer of Greco-Roman papyrology, and is credited for amassing an extensive archive of Ptolemaic papyri documents and ostraca.

In 1906, he became a member of the Saxon Society of Sciences, and in 1921, he became a member of the Prussian Academy of Sciences.

== Works ==
Among his written works was a 1931 book on Alexander the Great (Alexander der Grosse), being translated into English in 1932 with the title "Alexander the Great" (translated by G.C. Richards). Other publications by Wilcken include:

- Observationes ad historiam Aegypti provinciae Romanae depromptae e papyris Graecis Berolinensibus ineditis. Haack, Berlin 1885.
- Griechische Ostraka aus Aegypten und Nubien, Ein Beitrag zur antiken Wirtschaftsgeschichte. (Greek ostracon of Egypt and Nubia, Contribution of historical antiques). two volumes. Giesecke & Devrient, Leipzig 1899. reprinted Hakkert, Amsterdam 1970.
- Grundzüge und Chrestomathie der Papyruskunde. Volume 1: Historical part (in two halves). Leipzig 1912. (volume 2: Legal part by Ludwig Mitteis 1859–1921).
- Griechische Geschichte im Rahmen der Altertumsgeschichte. (Greek history in the context of ancient history), Oldenbourg, Munich 1924; Ninth edition 1962 (revised by Günther Klaffenbach 1890–1972).
- Urkunden der Ptolemäerzeit (ältere Funde). (Proceedings of Ptolemaic era excavations, older findings); two volumes. De Gruyter, Berlin 1927, reprinted 1977, ISBN 3-11-005711-5. Abbreviated as UPZ in LSJ and other lexicons.
