= Societaetstheater =

Coordinates: 51°3′38″N 13°44′34″E

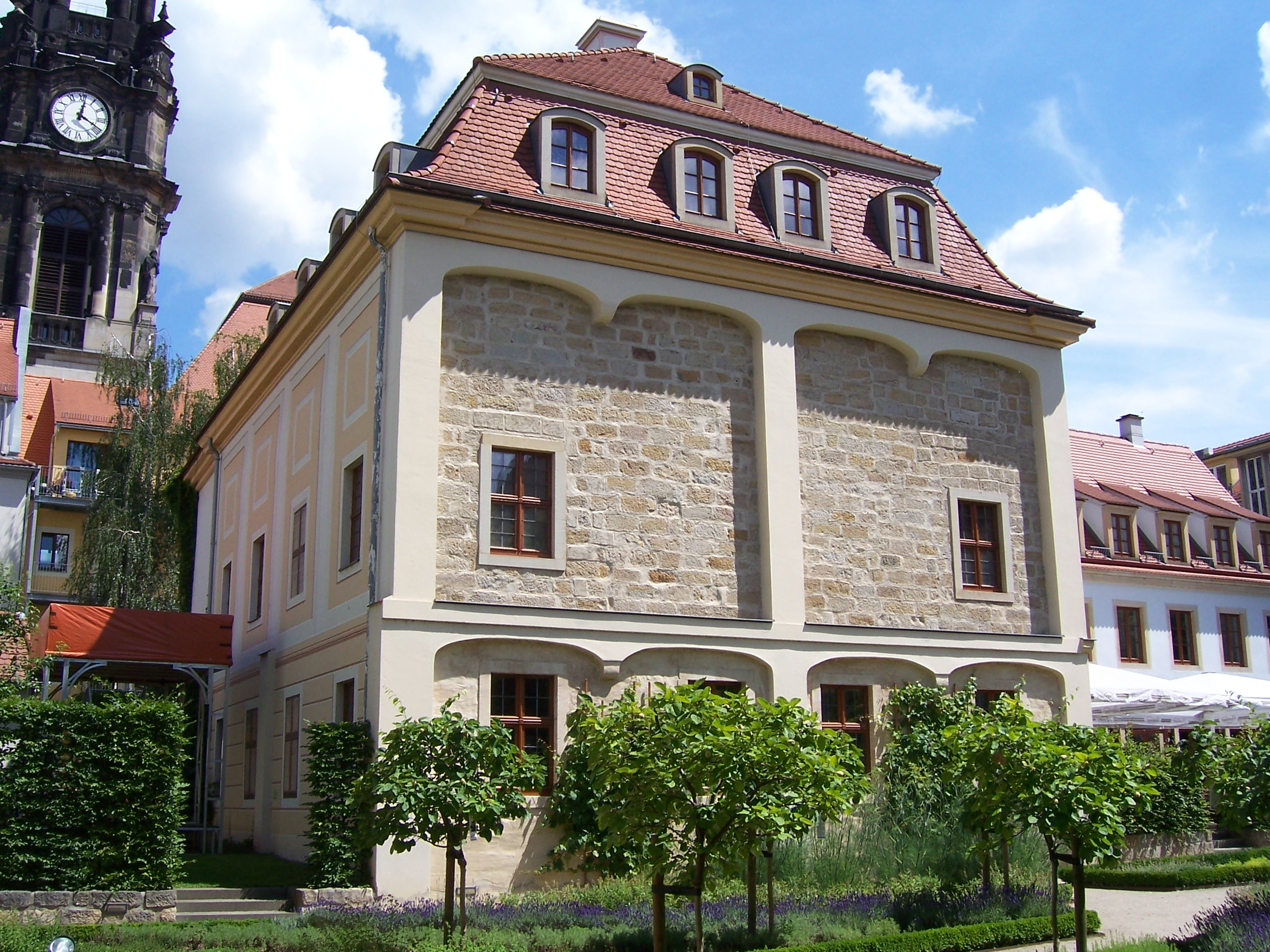
Societaetstheater building

The Societaetstheater is the oldest popular theatre in Dresden, Germany. Founded in 1776 as an amateur theatre by a society of friends from both the nobility and the middle class, it was initially respected and influential but declined in the early 19th century after the fashion shifted to elaborate historical and verse dramas and the national theatre movement grew in importance, and was eventually dissolved in 1832. The Baroque building on Hauptstraße in the Innere Neustadt was abandoned for many years in the second half of the 20th century, but beginning in 1979, a movement grew to restore it. The theatre reopened in 1999 and is now operated by the city.

== History ==
=== Foundation and heyday ===
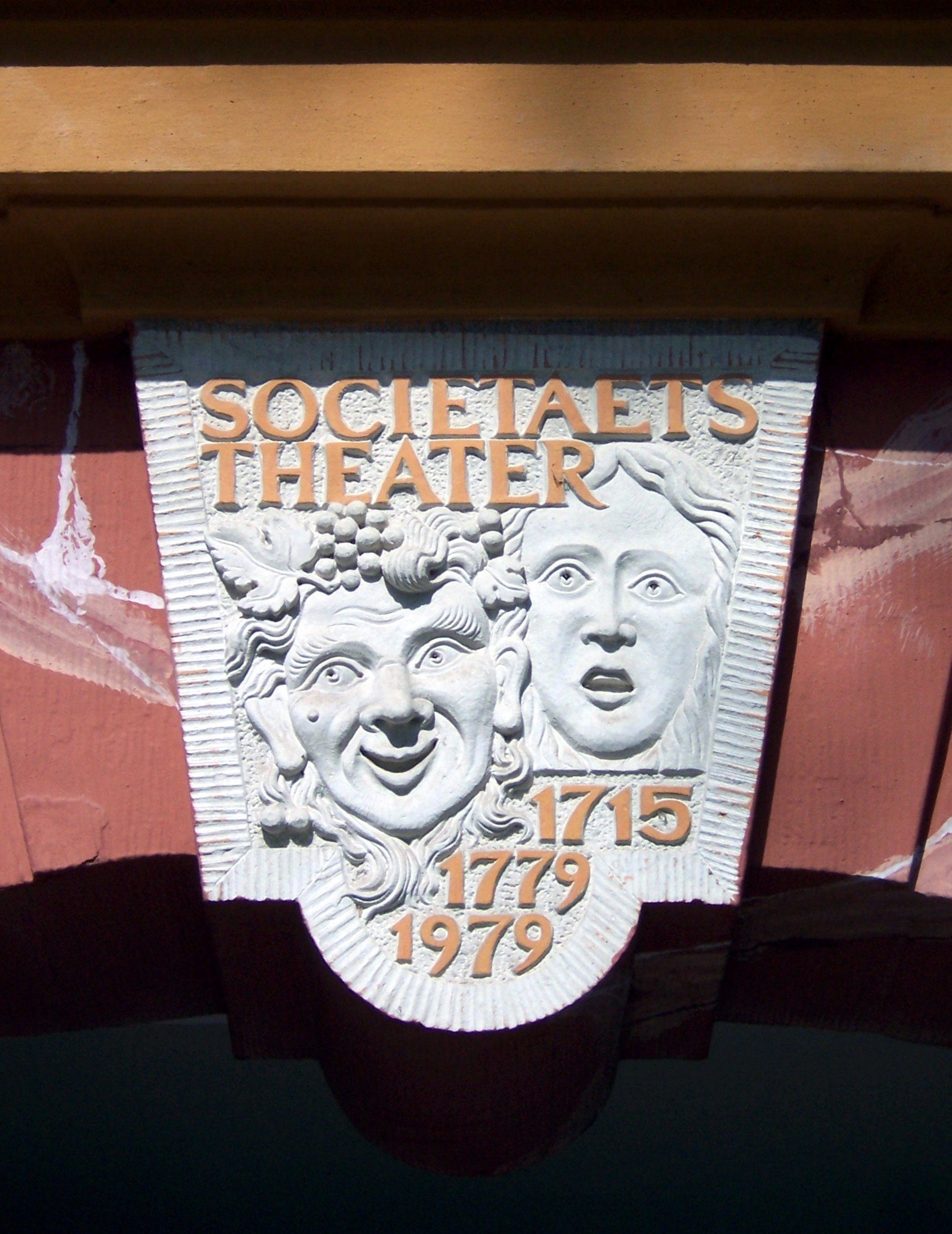
Keystone over the theatre entrance, by Jürgen Mehlhorn, 1979

After the end of the Seven Years' War in 1763, the theatrical landscape in Dresden shifted, with French actors being replaced by German, "partly to save money, partly out of patriotism". "Reformed" theatre groups such as that of Abel Seyler gained in respect against the court theatre, which was felt to be too focussed on spectacle, and the educated middle class began to emulate the amateur theatre of the aristocracy.

On 19 May 1776, a group of fifteen friends founded a society for the purpose of creating a private theatre in their leisure time, and the Societaetstheater was ceremoniously opened the same day, initially in a temporary home near the current location of the main station with a capacity of approximately 50 spectators.

In 1777, with the assistance of the publisher Conrad Georg Walter, the theatre moved to a larger building in Borngasse (near the current location of the German Hygiene Museum), but after Walter's death the following year, it moved again on 7 December 1779 to its current home, a garden building in the courtyard behind the residence of the government secretary Johann Christoph Hoffmann at Hauptstraße 19. This had been built in 1740 in Baroque style, intended for masquerades, but never used. It accommodated an audience of 250 and a 24-piece orchestra. The 6 by 5 metres (20 ft × 16 ft) stage was small even then; it was illuminated with wax or tallow candles in special holders designed to reflect the light on the desired spot. The interior was by Johann Ludwig Giesel, who also designed the interior of the original Gewandhaus in Leipzig. The design for the curtain in 1779 was by Johann Eleazar Zeissig, known as Schenau, a director of the Dresden Academy of Fine Arts; it depicted, amongst genii and garlands of roses, scenes from Greek mythology, such as Thalia, the muse of comedy, showing a youth the way to the temple of virtue while a bacchante tried to draw him towards the temple of lust.

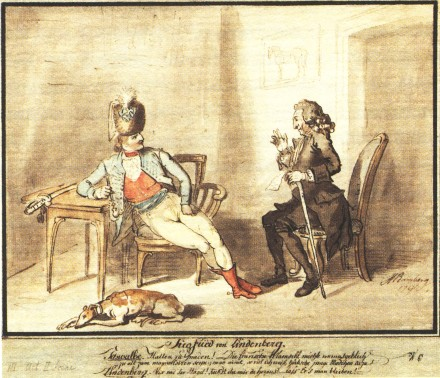
Watercolour by Johann Heinrich Ramberg of a performance of Siegfried von Lindenberg at the Societaetstheater in 1790

The society of friends of the theatre grew to fifty members, and by the end of the 18th century to more than 75. They belonged to both the nobility and the middle class and agreed to a 25-article constitution which included equality of members. Decisions and assignment of positions were voted on; five board members, a secretary and a cashier were elected, whose duties included determining the list of plays and assignment of roles.

The constitution divided the society's membership into active and passive members. The active members were overwhelmingly attached to the court of Saxony. For example, the privy advisor of the privy council, Hans Ernst von Teubern, translated scripts into German. The poet August Gottlieb Meißner used his influence within the society to secure performances of works by his friend Gotthold Ephraim Lessing. Other members wrote plays themselves or, like the painter Ernst Ferdinand Oehme in the 19th century, performed on stage. Altogether between 20 and 30 of the members were active as performers, leading to frequent doubling of roles. The passive members included aristocratic patrons who funded needs such as costumes or the upkeep of the theatre. Such benefactors included Prince Charles of Saxony, Count Alois Friedrich von Brühl and Count Hans Moritz von Brühl.

Productions took place mainly in the winter season, between September and early May. Like almost all other theatres, the Societaetstheater closed for Lent. However, performances also took place on Fridays and Sundays, which out of respect for religion were avoided by public theatres in Dresden until the early 19th century. Performances of the Societaetstheater were usually restricted to members' family, friends and acquaintances; a 1792 announcement speaks of each member receiving three tickets. Outsiders were admitted only in exceptional cases and after presenting a calling card.

Nonetheless, the theatre soon acquired a reputation extending outside Saxony. Productions were reported on in theatrical publications alongside those of the established court theatres and tours by well known companies. The persistence of the theatre was remarked on, since similar associations were at the time usually short-lived. It became a model which was emulated in various cities. In Dresden itself, where there were also two public theatres, a summer theatre, and touring productions, a second theatrical association, the Freundschaftliche Theater, was founded in 1787; since some of the members belonged to both, this was combined with the Societaetstheater in 1789. By 1802, there were a total of twelve other theatres in Dresden.

=== Closing ===
The Societaetstheater was originally entirely amateur. There is no record of any appearances by actors from public theatres until 1800. In the early 19th century this began to change, as upcoming actors increasingly discovered the theatre as a place to hone their talent. Actresses including Demoiselle Hartmann, the Weinhold sisters and Luise Wagner, sister of Richard Wagner, used the theatre to make the transition to professional careers. The years around 1800 also saw a generational shift from the founders to their successors, who chose the stage as their profession while retaining close ties to the Societaetstheater, where they had begun their association with the theatre.

The bourgeois drawing-room dramas which dominated the repertoires of theatres of all sizes at the beginning of the 19th century made few demands in casting, time, settings or props. However, the general movement towards grand historical dramas, such as those by Goethe and Schiller, with their demanding costumes, complex verse which was difficult to memorise and to recite, and large casts, once more opened a gulf between professional and amateur drama. Dilettantism had a negative connotation; Goethe and Schiller themselves collaborated in the summer of 1799 on a compilation with that as its theme, Über den Dilettantismus. The Societaetstheater produced simple dramas and comedies, some slapstick; no production of Goethe or Schiller there is recorded. The theatre's reputation waned, and as the national theatre movement gained in importance, it was excluded from the mainstream. Many of the upper middle class regarded amateur theatre as at best a "harmless pleasure" with no particular moral or aesthetic merit. Financial, social and political pressures led the Societaetstheater to close on 19 May 1832 and the society was dissolved.

=== Reopening ===
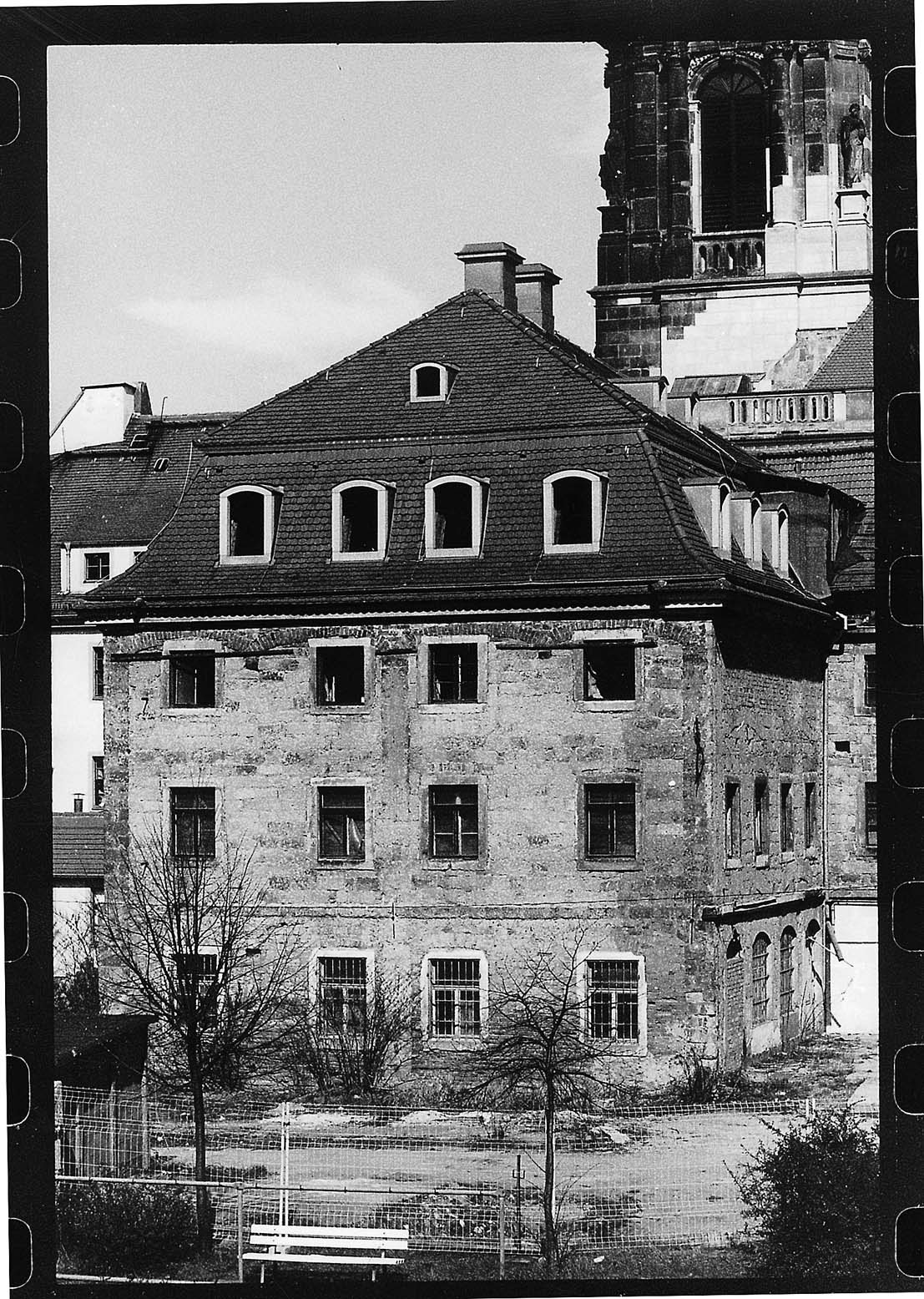
Theatre building before restoration

In 1837 a building was erected beside the theatre, covering almost half the façade. A second storey and more windows were added to the building itself, and beginning in the second half of the 19th century, it was used as a residence. In the early 20th century, small handwork businesses moved into what had been the foyer; traces of metalworking remain. The premises were also reportedly used by a photographic studio and by the post office.

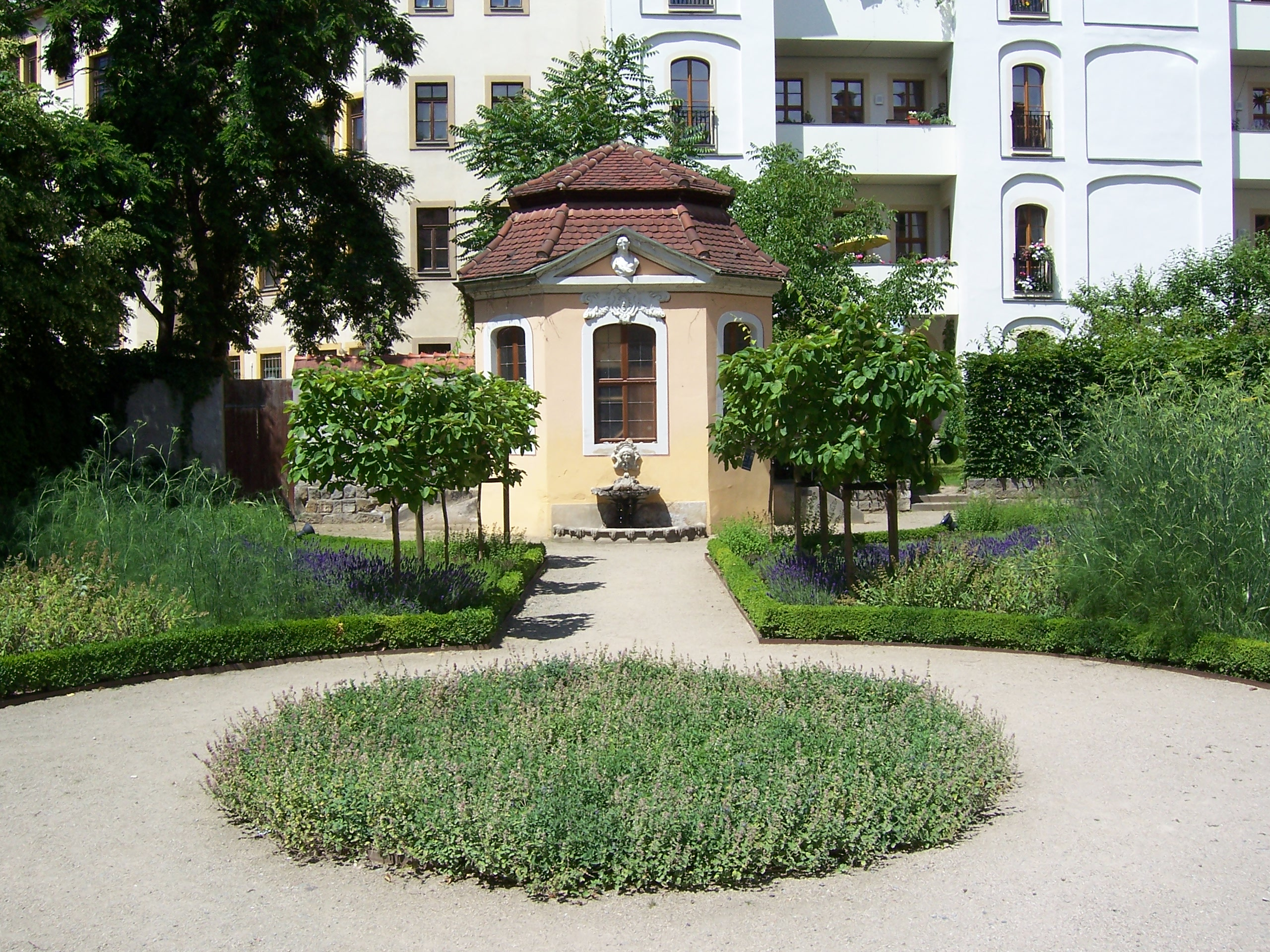
Pavilion in Baroque garden

The building was not destroyed in the bombing of Dresden on 13 February 1945, but fell into increasing disrepair after the war. In the 1950s and 60s, urgently needed repairs were not made, and from the 1970s on, the building was abandoned. Despite the renovation of the Hauptstraße beginning in 1978, the intention was to gut and demolish the building. The architect Jürgen Mehlhorn, who had become interested in the building while still a student and was now using it to store material for the reconstruction of other buildings on the street, in 1979 designed a keystone for the main entrance at Hauptstraße 19 depicting two theatrical masks and with the inscription "Societaetstheater 1715 1779 1979". The association "Interessengemeinschaft Societaetstheater" was then founded; in 1992 this became "Societaetstheater e.V." The association worked to preserve the building and raised money for urgent repairs such as roof work and provisional safety measures. In 1985, the building became a registered landmark of the German Democratic Republic. More extensive repairs were made in 1989. After German reunification in 1990, Dresdner Bank sponsored the building's restoration. The Dresden city council decided in October 1994 that the theatre would be operated by the city once restored, and work began in 1996.

The building was restored based on its original state, with the addition of an annexe containing a cellar theatre, a restaurant and five guest rooms. The adjoining Baroque garden, which had belonged to the sculptor Johann Benjamin Thomae amongst others, was also restored, and a restored pavilion by Thomae placed in the centre. The theatre had its ceremonial reopening on 19 February 1999.

== Current uses ==
The Societaetstheater today is a modern chamber theatre, accommodating spoken word, dance, music and puppet performances. Resident productions evolve by a workshop process harking back to the theatre's origins. Independent performers from the region as well as guest performers from Germany and other countries have appeared there. In addition to the main theatre and the cellar stage, performances may take place in the foyer and in the garden. It has served as one of the venues for the Jazztage Dresden festival.
