= Erich Kästner Museum =

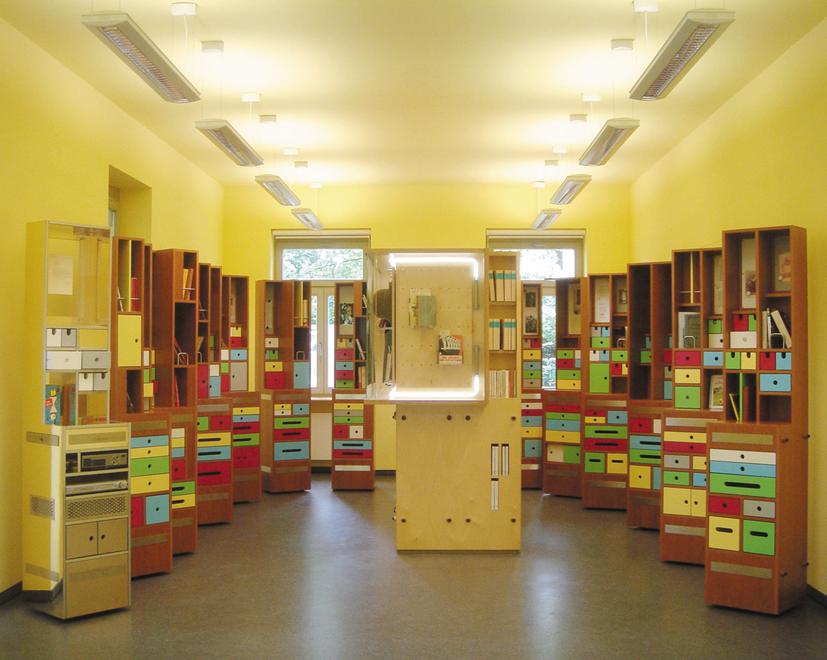
- Movable display cabinets with drawers
- Former name: Erich Kästner Centre
- Location: Literaturhaus Villa Augustin, Albertplatz, Dresden, Germany
- Coordinates: 51°03′50″N 13°44′45″E
- Type: Literary museum
- Visitors: 14,000
- Director: Andrea O'Brien
- Architect: Ruairí O'Brien
- Public transit access: Albertplatz tram stop
- Website: www.erich-kaestner-museum.de

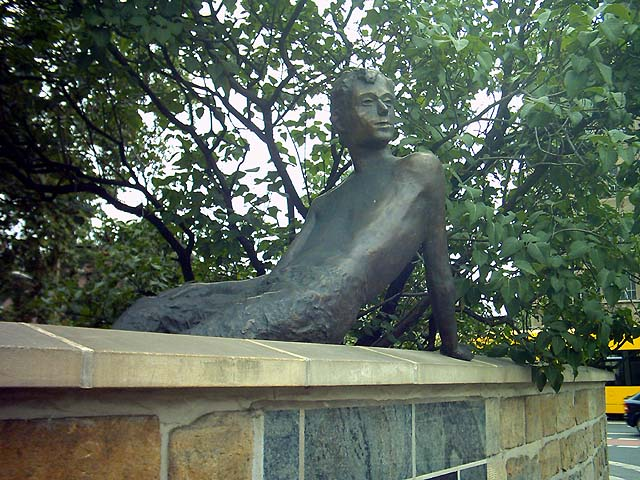
Bronze sculpture by Mathyas Varga of Erich Kästner as a boy, on a wall at the Erich Kästner Museum

The Erich Kästner Museum is a literary museum in Dresden, Germany. The museum covers the life and writings of German children's author Erich Kästner and is based in the Villa Augustin building which had belonged to Kästner's uncle. The museum is notable for its architecture, which was designed to be semi-mobile and fit within a single room, close to where Kästner had grown up in Dresden's inner new town (Innere Neustadt).

The museum focuses on Kästner's early years in Dresden and Leipzig, the connections between his work and children, and his relationship to the media. The museum collection includes first editions by Kästner, including his most famous work Emil and the Detectives, along with garments and objects belonging to Kästner.

== Museum ==
Established in 1999, the museum opened in early 2000 in celebration of the 101st anniversary of Kästner's birth in the Villa Augustin at the Albertplatz in the Innere Neustadt (inner new town). The villa was formerly owned and inhabited by Erich Kästner's maternal uncle Franz Augustin, a horse trader, and Kästner regularly visited it as a youth. In his autobiographical novel When I was a little Boy (Als ich ein kleiner Junge war) he refers to the Villa and many places in the vicinity. The museum has a bronze sculpture by the Hungarian artist Mathyas Varga of one such remembered scene, Kästner as a boy perched on the wall, looking out into the bustling square and listening to the trams in Dresden. In fact, Erich Kästner's childhood memories of Villa Augustin served him as an anchor point for inspiration; the main characters of the film Anna Louise and Anton (Pünktchen und Anton) are named after Kästner's cousin Dora Augustin, nicknamed "little dots" (Pünktchen), and the adjacent Anton-Street (Antonstraße, Dresden).

The museum was funded entirely by private donations, organised by the Förderverein für das Erich Kästner Museum / Dresdner Literaturbüro. The museum focuses on Kästner's years in Dresden and Leipzig, the connections between his work and children, and his relationship to the media.

The Albertsplatz tram stops adjacent to the museum are announced by the Dresdner Verkehrsbetriebe (DVB) as "Albertplatz - Erich Kästner Museum".

== Architectural concept ==
The museum format was designed around the architectural concept that "less is more". In his 1998 design, the Irish architect Ruairí O'Brien conceived of the museum as a "walkable treasure-chest" with core principles of mobility, interaction, and compactness, in other words a mobile, interactive micromuseum. Installed on the ground floor, it takes up no more than a single 30-square-metre (320 sq ft) room, within which are thirteen mobile modules, each with drawers color-coded to signify an aspect of Erich Kästner's life and work. With the exception of original exhibits from Kästner's estate, visitors are encouraged to touch, read, and try out whatever they can find. In the center of the modules, the core element exhibits selected items from Kästner's estate.

The large tree in front of the museum became a shoe tree (Schuhbaum), with pairs of shoes being thrown over the branches of tree. In 2018 the tree was cleaned of hanging shoes.

== Recognition ==
In 2002, the museum was awarded the Museum Prize from the Heinz and Brigitte Schirnig Foundation (Kulturstiftung-hbs) for its innovative open character and miniature scale. In 2003 the "micromuseum" design concept of the museum received an award from the German Federal Culture Foundation.
