= Jazztage Dresden =

Music festival in Germany

Jazztage Dresden is a jazz festival in Dresden, Germany, held annually in the autumn. International musicians such as Maceo Parker, Monty Alexander, Christopher Cross, Al Di Meola, Mike Stern or James Morrison and German jazz greats such as Paul Kuhn, Till Bronner or Günter Sommer have all appeared at the festival. Venues have included the Societaetstheater, the royal court at Wasaplatz, and Dresden Academy of Music.
