= Heinrich Nissen =

German professor of ancient history (1839–1912)

Heinrich Nissen (born 3 April 1839 in Hadersleben; died 29 February 1912 in Bonn) was a German professor of ancient history.

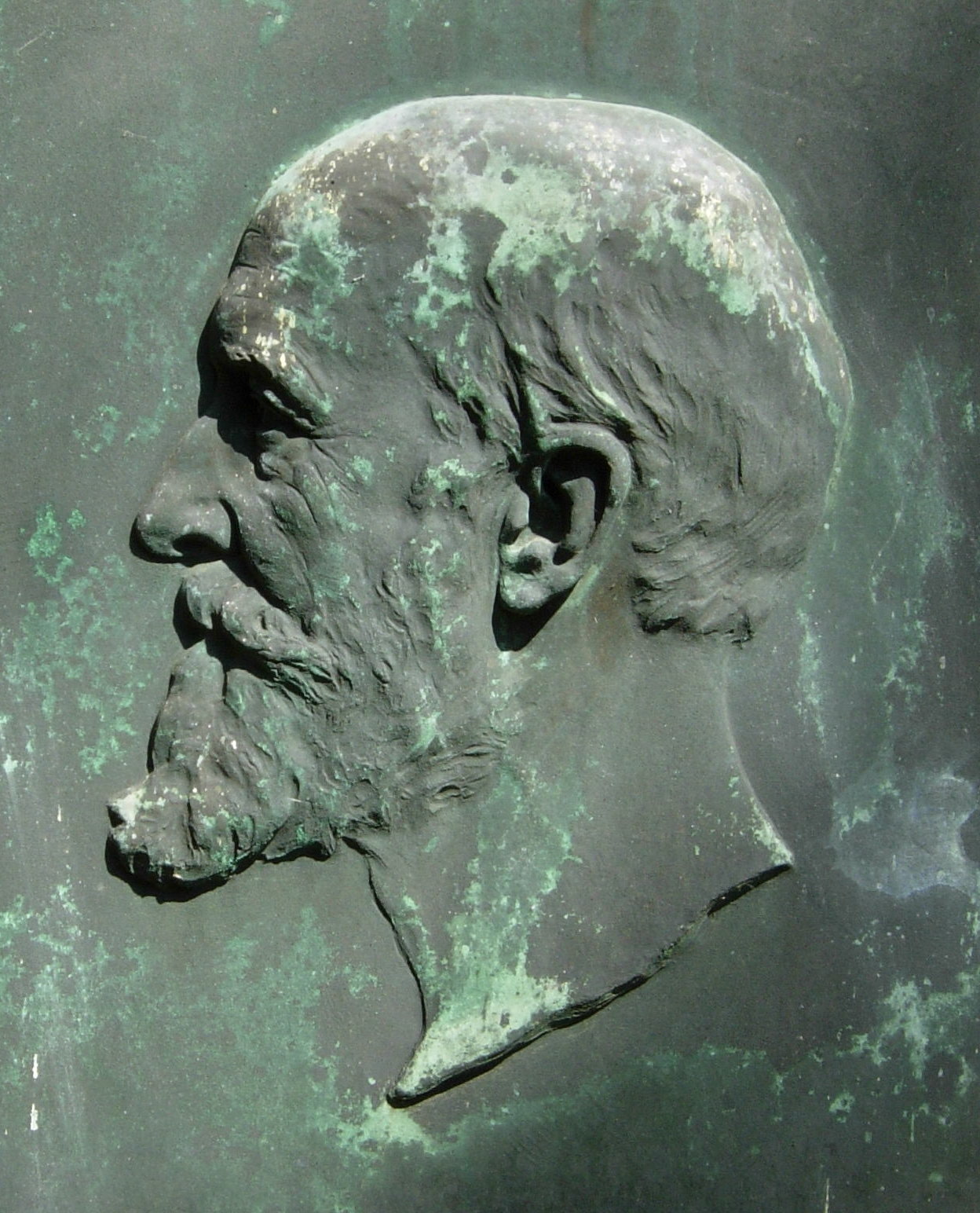
Bronze relief of Heinrich Nissen by Albert Küppers.

== Life ==
Heinrich Nissen studied in Kiel under Karl Wilhelm Nitzsch and in Berlin under August Boeckh and Theodor Mommsen. After graduating, he travelled in Italy between 1863 and 1867. This research was later published as the major work, Italischen Landeskunde (1883 and 1902).

In 1869 he became an associate professor at the University of Marburg, where during the following year he attained a full professorship. In 1877 he relocated to the University of Göttingen as a professor of ancient history, and soon afterwards, served as a professor at Strasbourg.

In 1884, he was elected as the successor to Arnold Schaefer at the University of Bonn. There, unlike his predecessor, he exclusively taught ancient history. He also pioneered epigraphic research at Bonn - based upon his study during his years in Italy - and was dedicated to Roman provincial archaeology. He was a co-founder of the Reichs-Limes-Kommission. Nissen is acclaimed as being possibly the first archaeoastronomer in the world.

He retired in autumn 1911, succeeded by Ulrich Wilcken. After his death he was buried in the Poppelsdorfer Friedhof (Poppelsdorfer Cemetery).

== Works ==
- Kritische Untersuchungen über die Quellen der vierten und fünften Dekade des Livius, 1863 – Critical studies of the sources from the fourth and fifth decades of Livy.
- Griechische und Römische metrologie, 1866 – Greek and Roman metrology.
- Pompeji, Lüderitz, Berlin 1867.
- (editor) : Ammiani Marcellini Fragmenta Marburgensia, Berlin: Weidmann, 1876 text
- Pompeianische Studien. Leipzig 1877.
- Italische Landeskunde: Bd. 1 Land und Leute, Berlin 1883; Bd. 2: Die Städte (2 Teilbände), Berlin 1902.
- Orientation, Studien zur Geschichte der Religion, 3 v. in 1, Berlin: Weidmann, 1906-1910.
