= Ernst Erwin Oehme =

German painter (1831–1907)

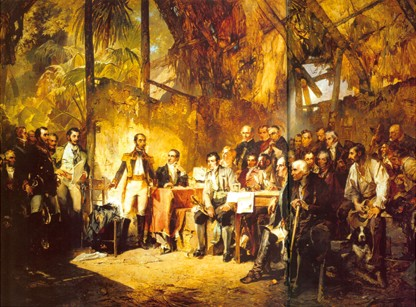
War Council, 1889

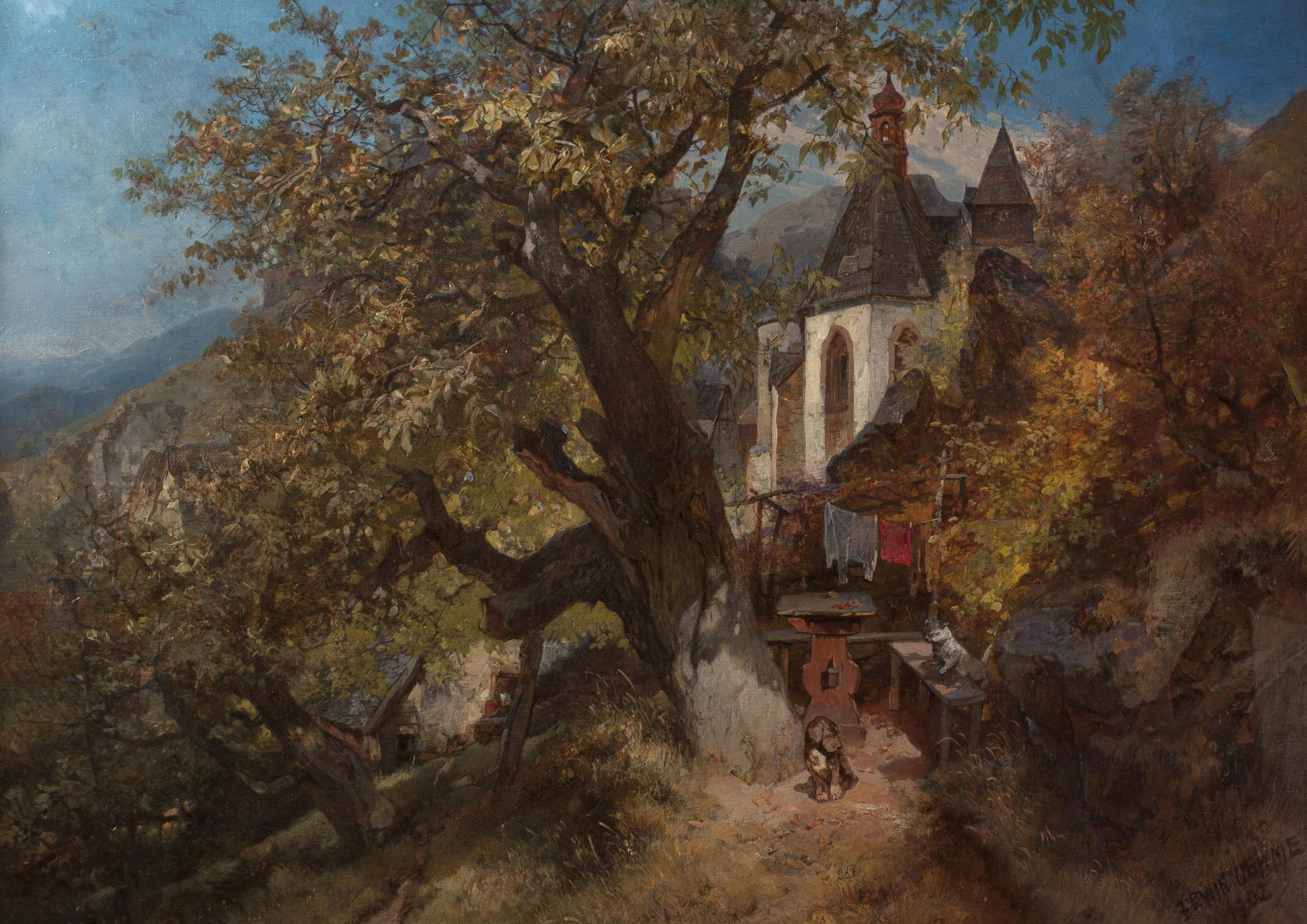
In the mountain city Graupen, 1902

Ernst Erwin Oehme (18 September 1831 – 10 October 1907) was a German painter known mainly for his oils and watercolor paintings of landscapes, architectural views, genre scenes and portraits.

== Biography ==
He was born in Dresden. He was son and pupil of Ernst Ferdinand Oehme, a landscape painter. He attended the Dresden Academy of Art, and for a short time worked under Ludwig Richter, after which he made an artistic tour through Germany, Switzerland, England and France. His studies of nature during his travels were the main influence on his style. He died in Blasewitz.

== Works ==
He painted, in oils and watercolors, landscapes, architectural views, genre and portraits. The court theatre at Dresden was decorated by him. For several royal palaces, he painted a series of tapestries in watercolor, in imitation of Gobelin tapestry.

In 1877 he executed three mural paintings representing the Rape of the Saxon Princes in 1415 in the banquet hall of the Albrechtsburg at Meissen, and in 1887–1889 painted the Declaration of Venezuela's Independence by Bolivar, a picture in heroic size for the House of Parliament at Caracas. For Queen Carola of Saxony, he produced a collection of views of Compiègne. Other notable works include Funeral in Spreewald, Stone Quarry in Saxon Switzerland, Bear Hunt (in watercolor) and The Valley of Montafont.
