= Karl Justus Blochmann =

German educator

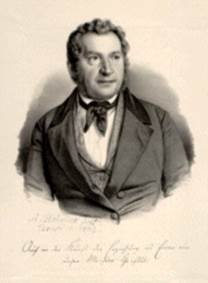
Karl Justus Blochmann (1843); lithograph by Adolf Hohneck

Karl Justus Blochmann (19 February 1786, in Reichstädt – 31 May 1855) was a German educator known for being among the first to introduce the "Pestalozzi method" of education into Saxony.

From 1805 he studied theology in Leipzig. In 1809 he relocated to Switzerland, where he spent eight years teaching classes at Johann Heinrich Pestalozzi's institute in Yverdon-les-Bains. Pestalozzi's educational philosophy had a profound influence on Blochmann that lasted throughout his lifetime.

== Blochmannsche Institute ==
In 1819 he returned to Germany, where he was appointed conrector at the Friedrich-August-Schule in Dresden. Desirous of a school system that took a more progressive, comprehensive approach to education, in 1824 with the support of Saxon cabinet minister Detlev Graf von Einsiedel (1773–1861), he founded the "Blochmannsche Institute" in Dresden. Among those who spent time as instructors at his school were, philologist Alfred Fleckeisen (1820–1899), agricultural chemist Julius Adolph Stöckhardt (1809–1886) and historian Arnold Dietrich Schaefer (1819–1883). Today, the institute is referred to as the "Vitzthum-Gymnasium".

== Selected writings ==
- Die Feier des dritten Jubelfestes der Uebergabe des Augsburgischen Glaubensbekenntnisses in der Blochmann'schen Erziehungsanstalt und dem Vitzthum'schen Geschlechtsgymnasium, 1830.
- Ein Wort über die Bildung unserer Jugend zur Wohlredenheit und öffentlichen Beredsamkeit, 1831.
- Heinrich Pestalozzi : Züge aus dem Bilde seines Lebens und Wirkens; nach Selbstzeugnissen, Anschauungen und Mittheilungen, 1846 - Heinrich Pestalozzi: Features from an image of his life and work to personal accounts, beliefs and communications.
