= Innere Neustadt (Dresden) =

Inner city district, Dresden, Germany

- Quarter of Dresden
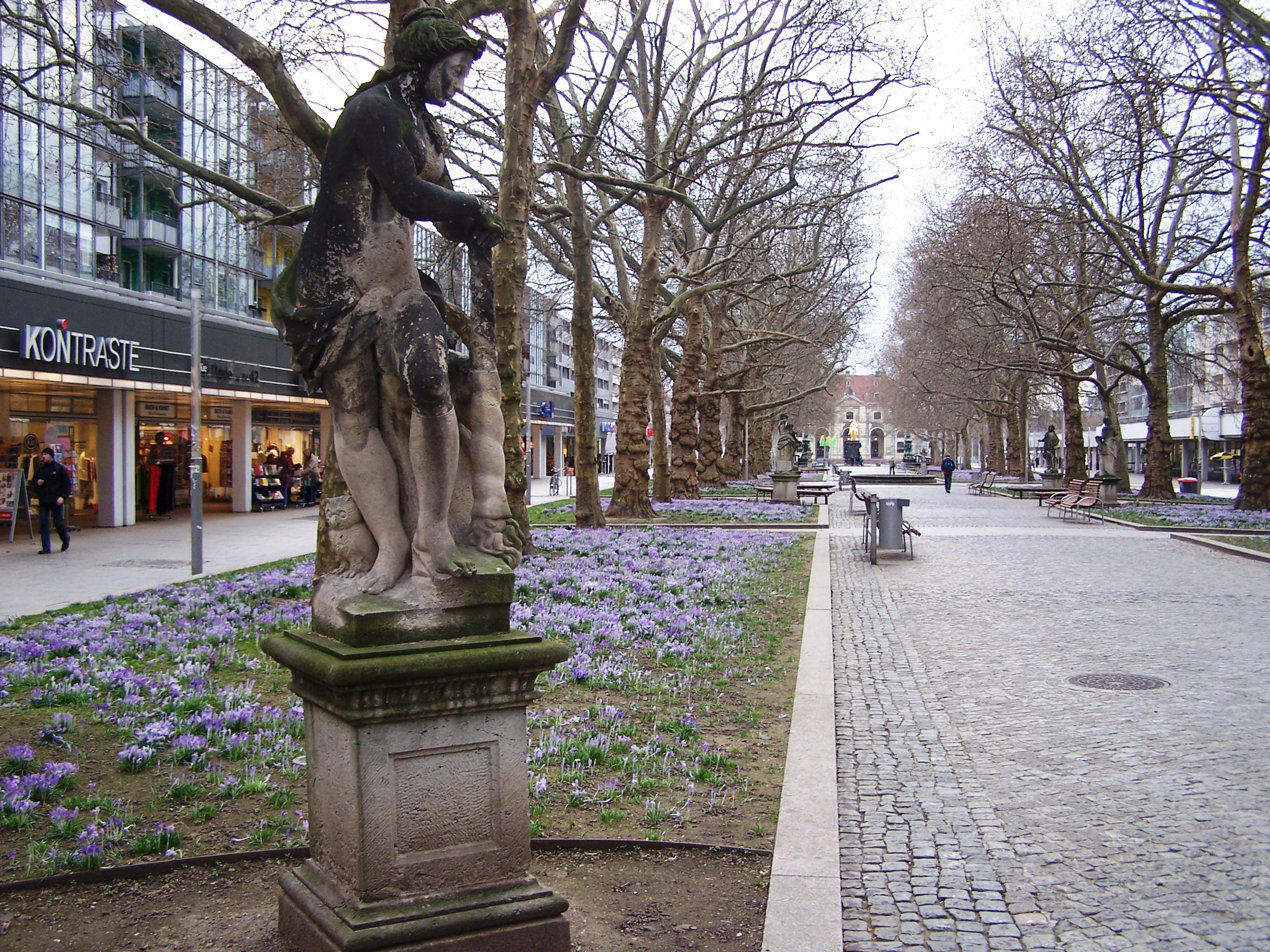
- Hauptstraße
- Interactive map of Innere Neustadt
- Location within Germany Location within Saxony
- Coordinates: 51°3′30″N 13°44′30″E
- Country: Germany
- State: Saxony
- District: Urban district
- City: Dresden
- Borough: Neustadt

Area
  - Total: 1.80 km^{2} (0.69 sq mi)

Population
  - Total: 7,761
  - Density: 4,310/km^{2} (11,200/sq mi)
- Time zone: UTC+01:00 (CET)
  - Summer (DST): UTC+02:00 (CEST)
- Vehicle registration: DD

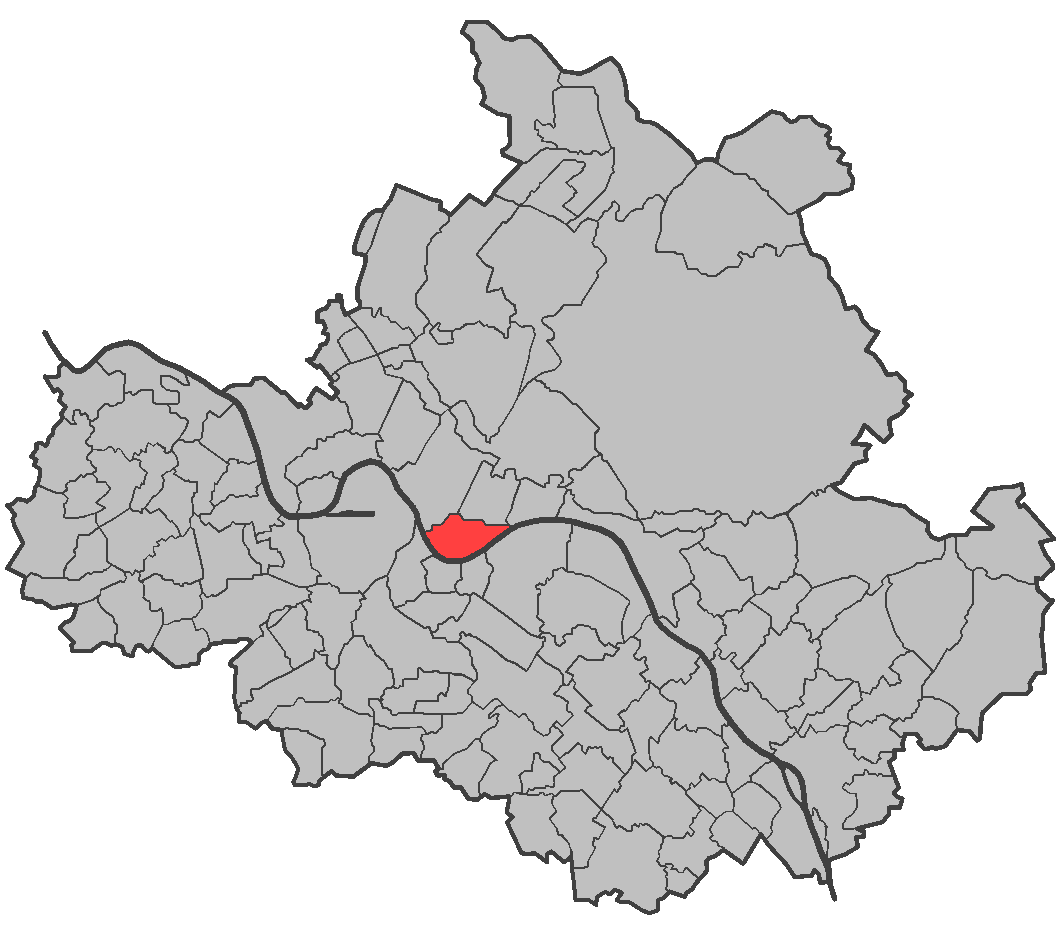
Location of Innere Neustadt in Dresden

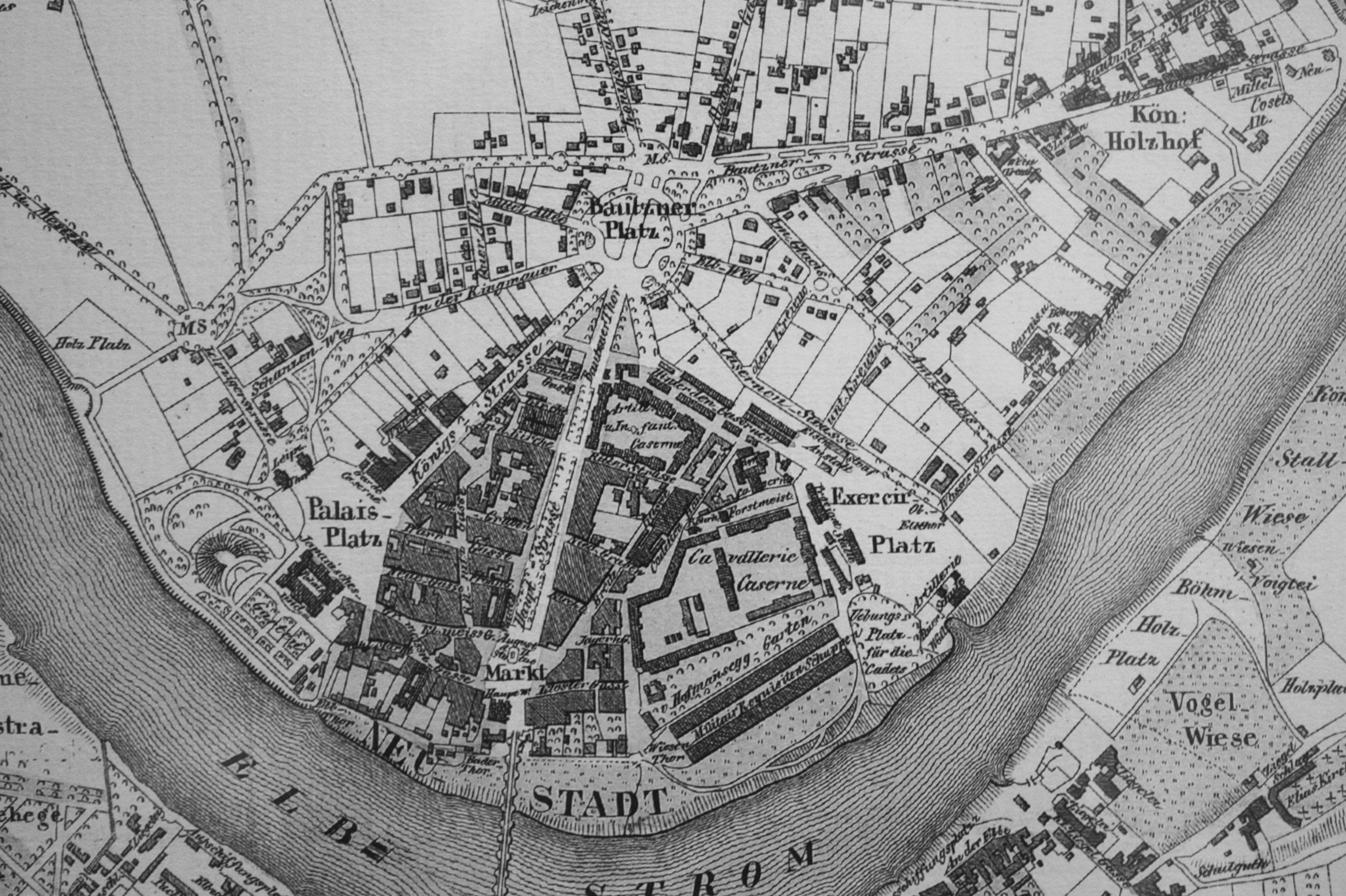
Map of Dresden 1837, showing Neustadt

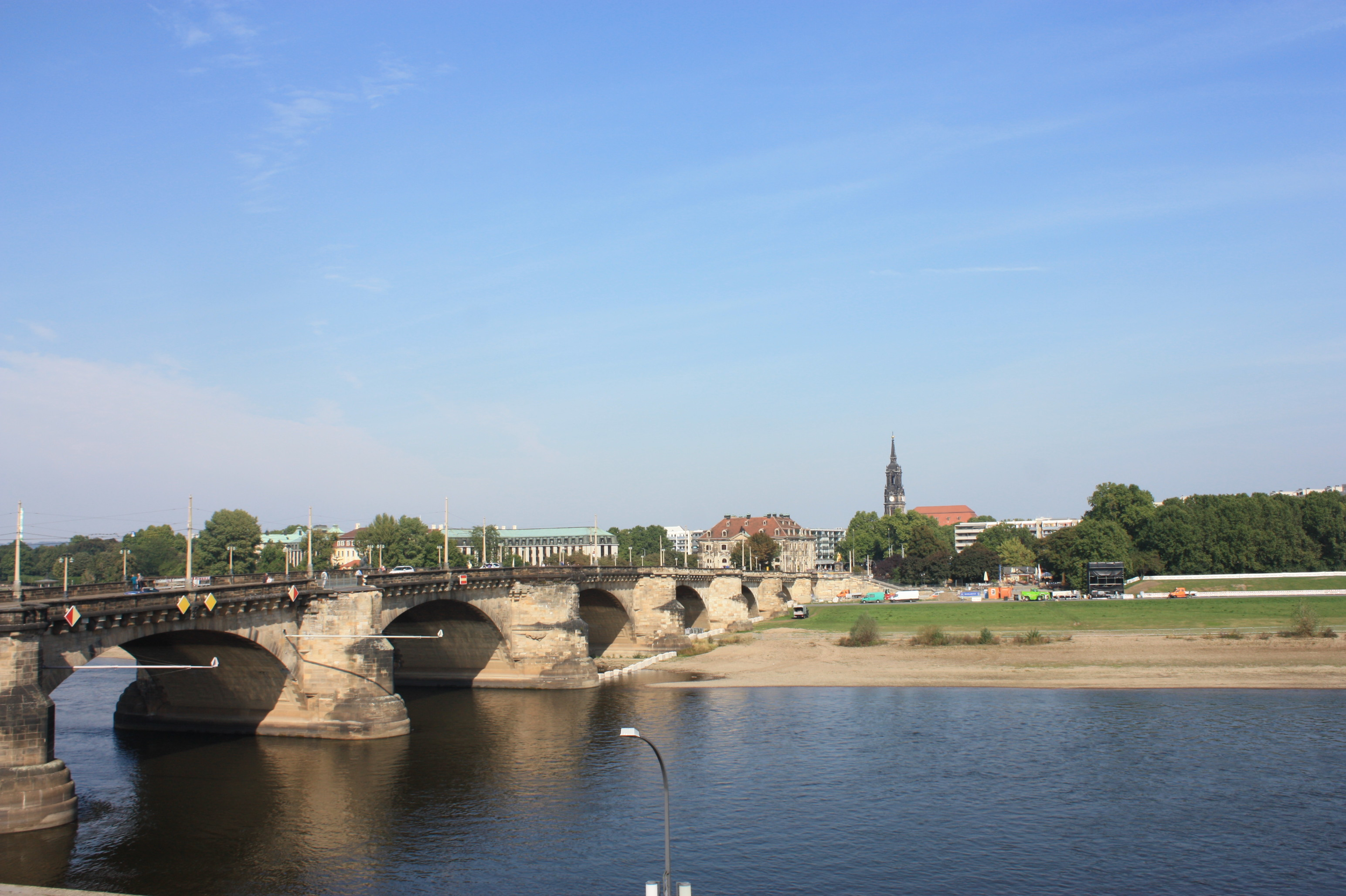
Augustusbrucke and Neustadt from the south bank of the Elbe

The Innere Neustadt (German pronunciation: [ˈɪnəʁə ˈnɔʏʃtat], "Inner New City") is a neighborhood in Dresden within the administrative district of Neustadt. The name is derived from "Neue Königliche Stadt" (New Royal City), the name given to the former district of Altendresden when it was rebuilt after a fire before 1732. In contrast to the Äußere Neustadt (Outer New City), the Innere Neustadt was within the city fortifications and, for that reason, is also known as the historic Neustadt. Its population is 7,761 (2020).

== Location ==
The Innere Neustadt is located in the administrative district of Neustadt, on the right bank across the Elbe and to the north of the Innere Altstadt (Inner Old City).

The River Elbe forms an enclosing arc around the Innere Neustadt. Four bridges cross the Elbe, connecting the district with the southern bank of the Elbe. Of these, only Augustusbrucke is historic. The streets leading to these bridges cross the Innere Neustadt and join at Albertplatz (Albert Place), at the northern end of the district (originally called Bautzner Platz).

== Cultural and architectural features ==
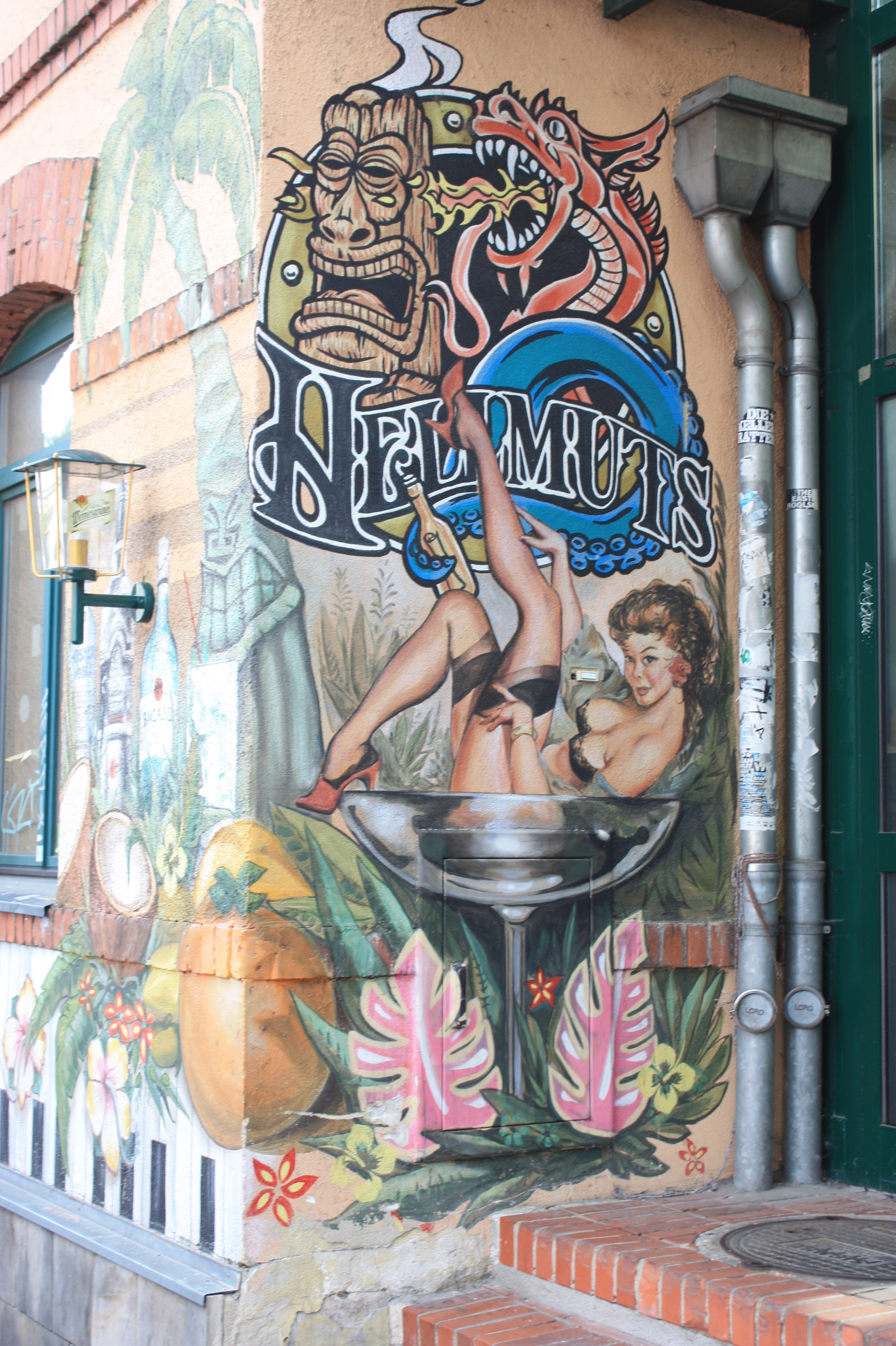
Street art in Neustadt

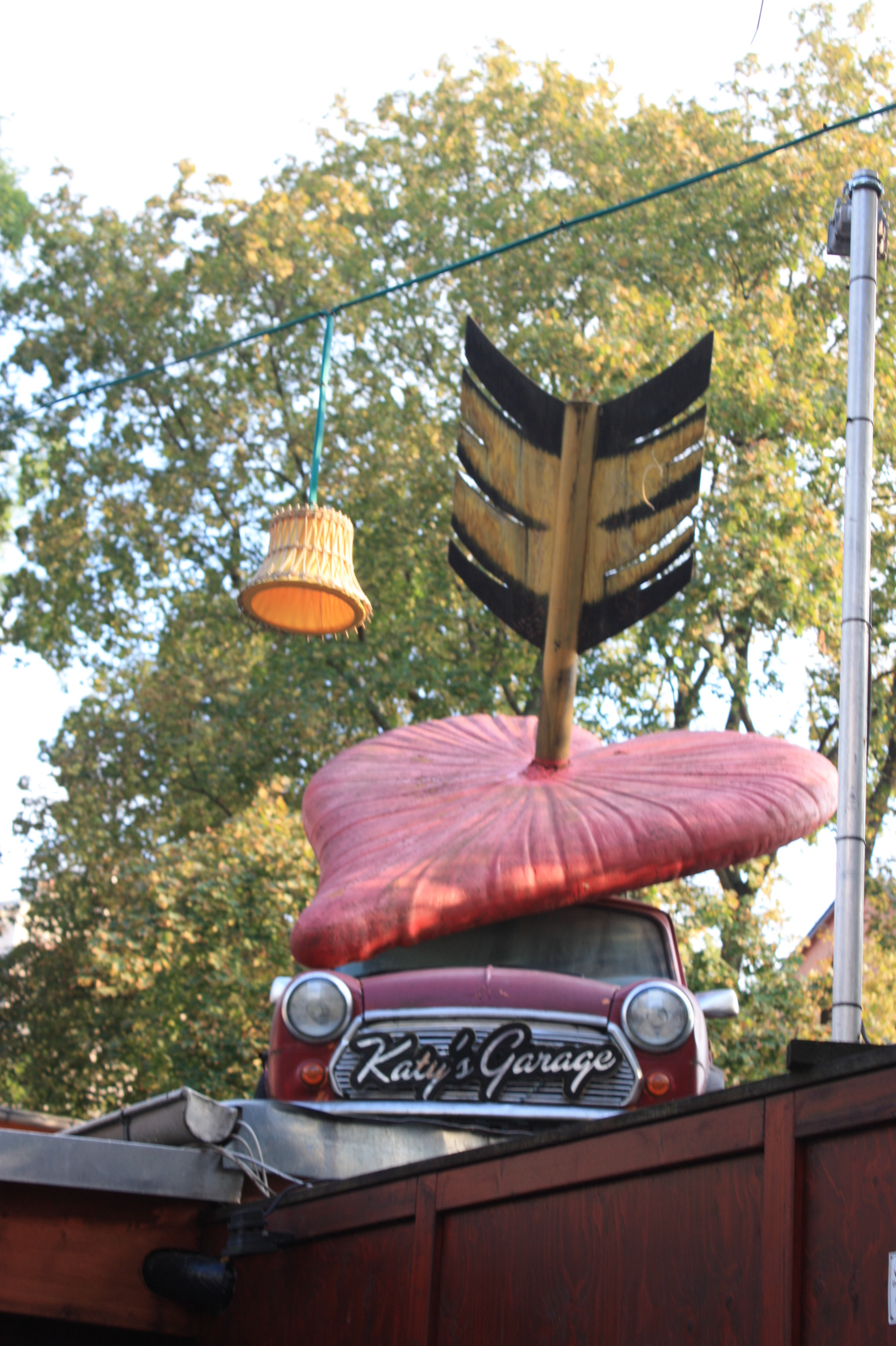
Katy's Garage

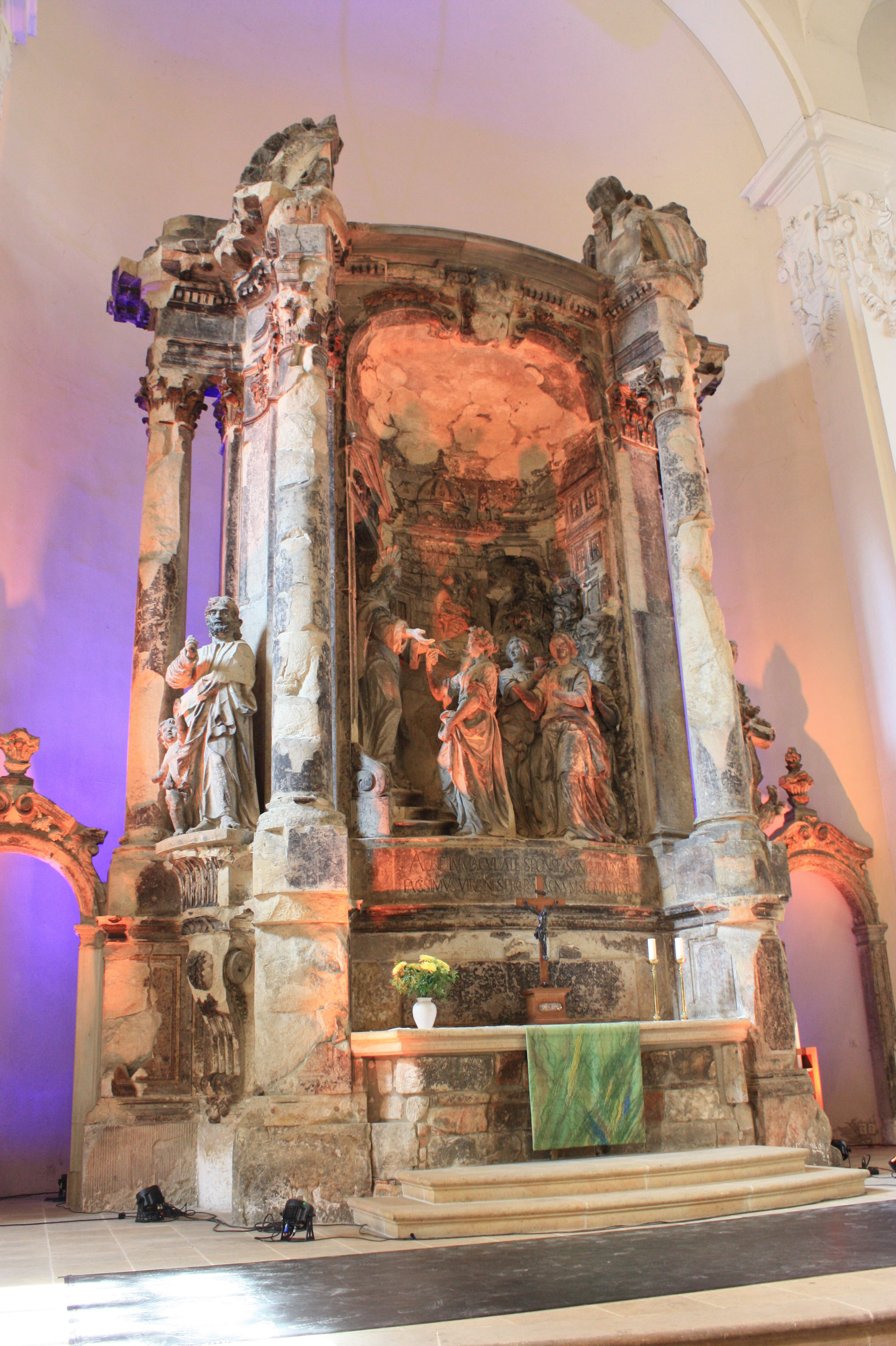
Altarpiece, Dreikönigskirche

Culturally (since the reunification of 1989) Neustadt has been associated with counter-culture and anti-authoritarianism, typified by a very high level of street art and graffiti, which greatly characterises the typical local street scene.

Several of Dresden's cultural institutions and museums lie within the Innere Neustadt. To the north, at Albertplatz is the Erich Kästner Museum, and, to the south, housed in the Japanisches Palais (Japanese Palace), is the State Museum of Ethnology. On the Hauptstraße (High Street) are the Dresden Soccer Museum, the Kügelgenhaus, and the Museum of Dresden Romanticism. In Rähnitzgasse is the Kunsthaus Dresden (Dresden Art House) and close by the Societaetstheater (Society Theatre). The Jägerhof is the home of the Museum for Saxon Folk Art and the Puppet Theater Collection of the State Art Collections.

Major cultural events include: the City Festival, held mainly on Hauptstraße; and the Filmnächte (Movie Nights), which take place on the flood plain of the Elbe (the "Elbe Meadows") in the summer.

Innere Neustadt also contains many important buildings, and has the most concentrated collection of baroque architecture in Dresden, with its winding alleys, passages, inner courtyards and wide boulevards lined by baroque facades. These are best preserved in the area around Königsstraße, Rähnitzgasse and Hauptstraße, sometimes referred to as the Barockviertel or Barockviertel Königstraße.

The reconstruction of the neighborhood until 1732 was carried out in baroque style. Baroque town houses can still be found mainly on Königstraße. One of the buildings unchanged since 1733 is number 15 in Großen Meißner Straße ('Large Meissen Road'). The historically important complex of buildings survived the wartime destruction of Dresden and now forms the central part of what is currently the Hotel Bellevue.

The Dreikönigskirche, destroyed and rebuilt several times, was the seat of the Saxon parliament from 1990 to 1993. Along the banks of the river Elbe are the government buildings of the so-called 'government quarter' and the Japanisches Palais.

The famous statue of August the Strong (known locally as the Golden Rider) stands at the south end of the Hauptstrasse. On Albertplatz is the artesian well. The largest fully automatic public parking garage is in the Innere Neustadt.

== Second World War ==
The destruction within Neustadt in February 1945 was extensive but not as comprehensive as within the Altstadt to the south. Rebuilding respected the original street pattern but, whilst respectful in terms of height, is architecturally typical of the 1960s and does not reflect Dresden's original character. The Hauptstrasse in particular shows little evidence of its history. The western district around Königstrasse survived more successfully and retains the majority of its historic character.

Until February 1945, the large Neustädter Rathaus (New City Town Hall) was on Neustädter Markt. After its destruction the Rathaus was not rebuilt, a Plattenbau complex taking its place instead. An initiative has been founded with the goal of reconstructing the Rathaus and restoring the Neustädter Markt.

== Traffic and Infrastructure ==
The most important streets are: the Hauptstraße (a pedestrian street), connecting to the Augustusbrucke (Augustus Bridge); Albertstraße, connecting to the Carolabrucke (Charles Bridge); and Königstraße. Secondary streets include Antonstraße (the extension of the Marien Bridge), Bautzner Straße, and Große Meißner Straße.

A total of eight trams run in the district on two east–west and three north–south routes. The most important tram hub is Albertplatz. Except for bus line 81, which connects to the Innere Neustadt at the Neustadt train station, no city bus lines service the district, only regional buses.

The Innere Neustadt is bordered in the west by the railway arches holding the rail line connecting Dresden to Leipzig. The train station Dresden-Neustadt in the northwest of the district is served by local and long-distance trains.

== Business and Government ==
Key economic sectors of the Innere Neustadt are gastronomy and retail. As in the Innere Altstadt, many hotels and restaurants are located in this part of the inner city. The largest hotel is Hotel Bellevue, of the Westin hotel chain. Both Königstraße and Hauptstraßse are important shopping districts in the center of Dresden.

The State Chancellery and all ministries of the Free State of Saxony are centered on Carolaplatz, forming the government district. Currently, there are eight ministries in historical as well as newly constructed buildings. The State Archives are also located in the government district.

The local office for the entire Neustadt (Innere and Äußere) is located in this part of town.

== See also ==
- 01099, a German rap crew whose name refers to the postal code of the area
- Altendresden
- Liste der Barockbauten in Dresden

== Bibliography ==
- Rosner, Ute (2022). "Dresdens Innere Neustadt". Dresden-Lese (Dresden Reading) (in German). Weimar: Bertuch Verlags.
- Bley, Andreas Nütt (2022). "Geschichte des Dresdner Barockviertels". Dresden Central (in German and English).
- DBK (2022). "Das Dresdner Barockviertel Königstrasse" (in German).
- Landeshauptstadt Dresden (2012). "Stadtteil 13 - Innere Neustad" (PDF). Dresden (in German).(Official statistics)
- Landeshauptstadt Dresden (May 2021). "Dresden in Zahlen IV. Quartal 2020" (PDF). Dresden (in German).
- Landeshauptstadt Dresden (23 February 2017). "Innere Neustad". Dresden Stadtraum (in German).(Urban planning)
